= Charles, Duke of Vendôme =

16th-century French prince and governor

Charles de Bourbon
- Duc de Vendôme
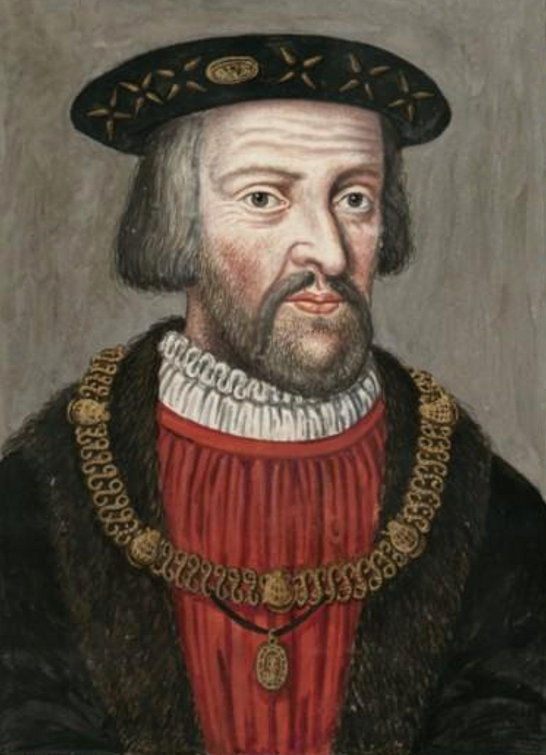
- 18th-century portrait
- Born: 2 June 1489; Château de Vendôme, France
- Died: 25 March 1537 (aged 47); Amiens, France
- Spouse: Françoise d'Alençon
- Issue See Wife and children: Marie; Marguerite; Antoine; François; Charles; Jean; Louis
- House: Bourbon-Vendôme
- Father: Francis, Count of Vendôme
- Mother: Marie de Luxembourg

Charles de Bourbon, Duke of Vendôme (2 June 1489 – 25 March 1537) was a French soldier, governor, prince du sang and courtier during the reigns of King Louis XII and King Francis I. Charles was the son of Francis, Count of Vendôme, and Marie of Luxembourg. Beginning his military career in the Italian Wars of Louis XII, he saw service at the crushing French victory of Agnadello in 1509 and the capture of Genoa in 1507. With the death of the King Louis XII in 1515, he continued his service under King Francis. He was rewarded with the elevation of the County of Vendôme to the rank of the Duchy of Vendôme, and he was also made governor of the Île de France. He joined the king for his first Italian campaign in 1515. He thus participated in the Battle of Marignano. Returning to France, he traded his government of the Île de France for that of Picardy in 1519. It would be in Picardy he saw most of his military service for the rest of his life. He participated in the northern campaigns against the Holy Roman Empire first, then against England in 1521 and 1522, respectively. In 1523, his cousin, Charles III, Duke of Bourbon, defected to the Imperial cause. The king feared Vendôme might follow him in his treason and recalled him from Picardy. Thus Louis II, vicomte de Thouars, led the campaign in the north in 1523. The Duke of Vendôme, having proven his loyalty, was soon permitted to return north, and he played a role, alongside Thouars, in combatting the Chevauchée of the Duke of Suffolk that was threatening Paris in the Autumn. In late 1524, the king departed France to conquer Milan. His campaign ended in disaster at the Battle of Pavia, at which he was captured.

Vendôme had been entrusted with the defence of Picardy during the king's absence and was not at Pavia. Thus he had a key role to play in the regency government of the king's mother Louise. Along with several other key military figures he was responsible for the defence of the kingdom at a very sensitive moment. He had also become the premier prince du sang with the death of the duc d'Alençon, putting him fourth in the line of succession. He was frustrated by his situation, as though he was the nominal chair of the royal council in Lyon, he was unable to prevent Louise favouring the vicomte de Lautrec over him and snubbing his wife's rights to the Alençon inheritance. Nevertheless, though a faction in the Paris Parlement wished for him to usurp the regency, he did not put himself at the head of an opposition party. In 1526, Francis was conditionally released from his captivity and the regency ended. With it ended Vendôme's central position in the government. In the coming years he was present for many important ceremonies, such as the king's special sessions of the parlement, meetings with the English and the release of the king's sons from captivity. In December 1527 he led the nobility at a meeting called by the king to endorse his breaking of the terms of the treaty of Madrid by which he had secured his freedom after Pavia. He assured Francis on behalf of the nobility that they would devote their lives and property to him.

A new crisis emerged for the kingdom in 1536. Vendôme worked to secure funds for his soldiers in Picardy, and came into conflict with the cardinal du Bellay who the king had placed in charge with Paris. Vendôme was frustrated by the quality of his troops, and what he felt were insufficient exertions by du Bellay to support him. The Imperial siege of Thérouanne would fail, and with it the crisis passed. Vendôme was again involved in the campaign of 1537, however he came over ill in March and died in Amiens on 25 March. His grandson would become king of France as Henry IV.

== Early life and family ==
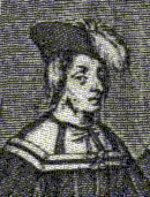
Charles' father, François de Bourbon

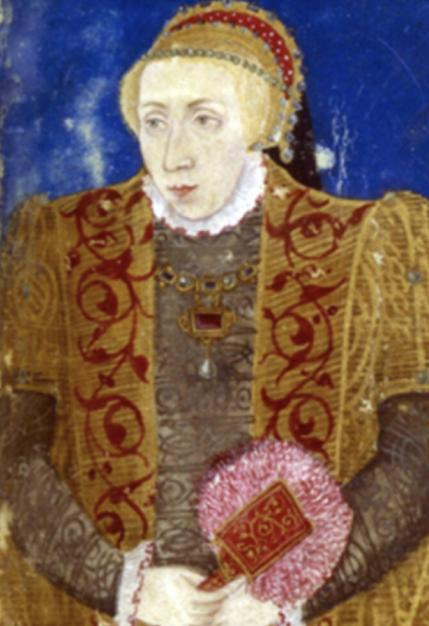
Charles' mother, Marie de Luxembourg, probable portrait

Charles de Bourbon was born in Vendôme castle, on 2 June 1489 , the son of François de Bourbon, comte de Vendôme, and Marie de Luxembourg, dame de Saint-Pol.

The house of Bourbon had its origins in the sixth son of king Louis IX, the comte de Clermont (count of Clermont). Vendôme was a direct agnatic (through the male line) descendant of Louis IX through Clermont. His mother, Marie, was the granddaughter and heir to the disgraced connétable de Saint-Pol who was executed in 1475. Though the lands held by the Luxembourg connétable had been confiscated, in 1487 the lands were returned to Marie for the occasion of her marriage. From his mother therefore, Charles would inherit many Picard lands, among them: La Fère, Ham and Condé-en-Brie. She also brought him Flemish fiefs, including Enghien, though these revenues would be confiscated by the Holy Roman Emperor. The Bourbon territories in Picardy would be governed from the château de La Fère. The strong position inherited by Charles in Picardy through his mother granted the Bourbon-Vendôme a position in Picardy that no other seigneur (lord) could challenge. In addition to her land, was their status as princes du sang, which ultimately made first Charles de Bourbon and then his son's control of the governorship inevitable. The marriage of François and Marie was made at the direction of the king Charles VIII and would transpire in February 1488. By means of the marriage, the king hoped to tie the Luxembourg family's interests to those of the junior royal branch (the Bourbon-Vendôme).

Charles had four siblings from his parents' marriage, among whom were two brothers:

- François de Bourbon, comte de Saint-Pol (1491–1545). Saint-Pol would serve as the governor of Dauphiné.
- Louis de Bourbon, cardinal de Bourbon (1493–1553).

Charles' sister Antoinette de Bourbon, married the comte de Guise (a member of the house of Lorraine), who in 1524 was made the governor of Champagne and then in 1527 became the first duc de Guise and a pair de France (peer of France). Charles' other sister became the abbess of Fontevraud.

Upon the early death of François in 1495, Marie was left to administer both her own lands, and the comté de Vendôme (county of Vendôme) of her late husband. She would remain a widow until her death in 1546, devoting herself to the administration of her estates in Picardy (region of north east France). She was an active manager of these estates.

=== Wife and children ===
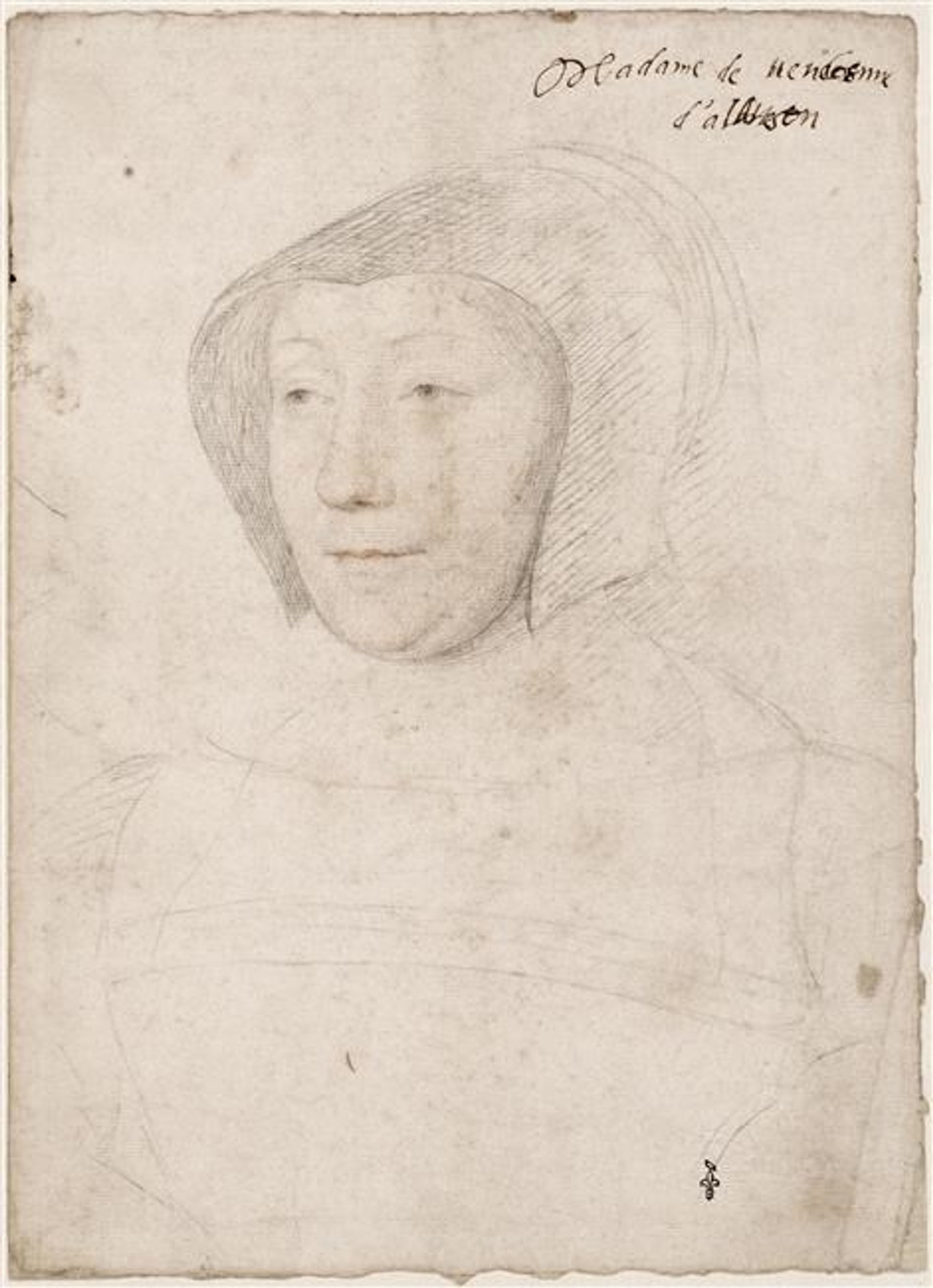
Charles' wife Françoise d'Alençon

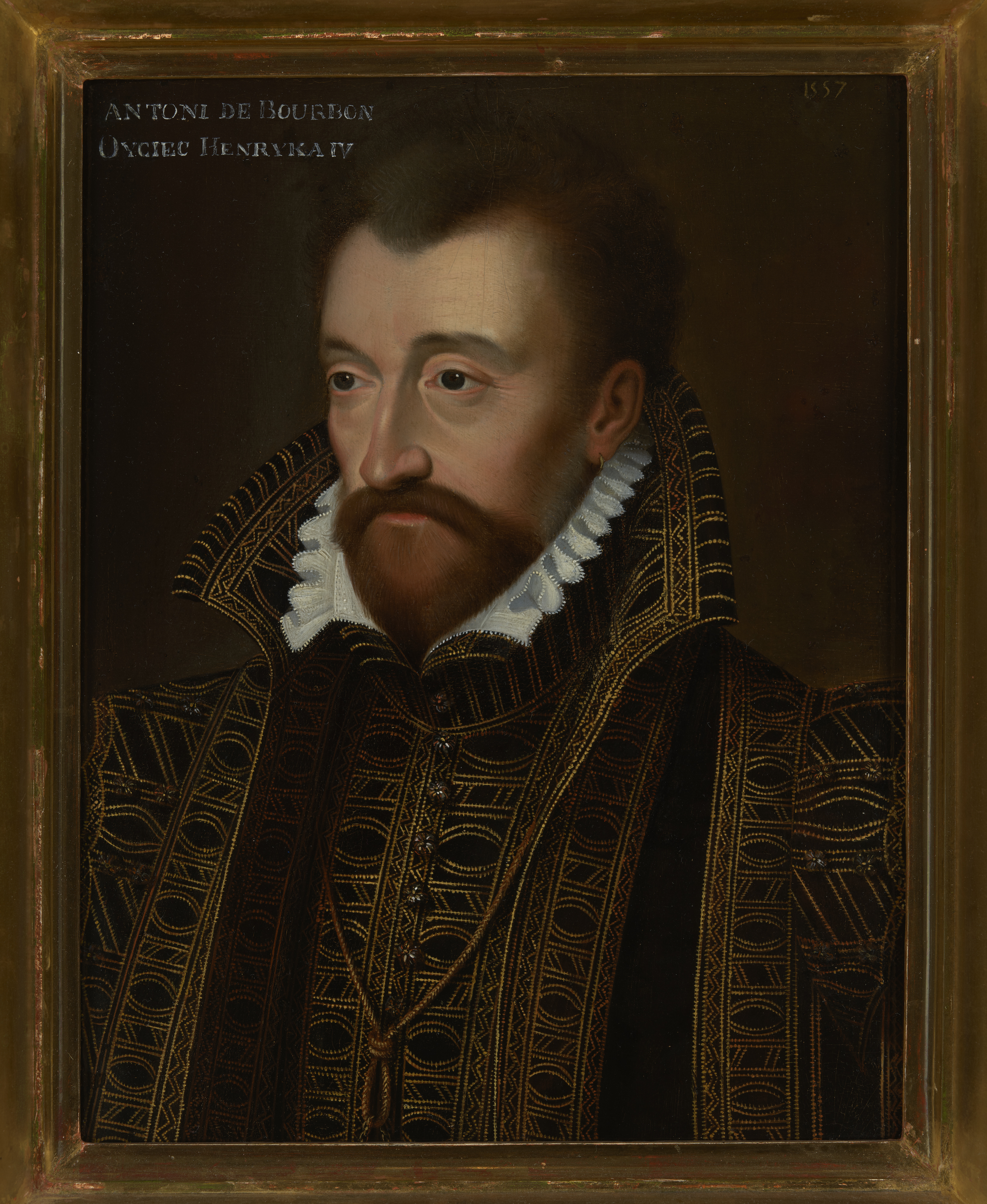
Charles' son Antoine, who would become the king of Navarre by his marriage to Jeanne d'Albret and would be the father of king Henry IV

On 16 May 1513, Charles de Vendôme married Françoise d'Alençon, the widow of the duc de Longueville, at Châteaudun. She was the daughter of René de Valois, duc d'Alençon and Marguerite de Lorraine. She was also the sister of the premier prince du sang (first prince of the blood - closest agnatic relative to the king outside the royal family) Charles de Bourbon, duc d'Alençon. This created a connection between the two subordinate branches of the royal house.

Vendôme's wife brought the baronnies de Château-Gontier, La Flèche and Beaumont-sur-Sarthe with her to the marriage. On the occasion of the marriage, Vendôme's mother Marie (de Luxembourg) declared him to be her principal heir, and he was granted 8,000 livres annually; although Marie would continue to enjoy the usufructs on her properties for the remainder of her life.

His wife would outlive him, dying in 1550.

With Françoise d'Alençon, he would have thirteen children:

- Louis de Bourbon (23 February 1514 – 7 April 1516) comte de Marle.
- Marie de Bourbon (29 October 1515 – 28 September 1538), prospective bride for the king of Scotland.
- Marguerite de Bourbon (26 October 1516 – 20 October 1559), married the duc de Nevers with issue.
- Antoine de Bourbon (22 April 1518 – 17 November 1562), duc de Vendôme, later king of Navarre, married Jeanne d'Albret, queen of Navarre: their son Henry would ascend the French throne as Henry IV in 1589.
- François de Bourbon (23 September 1519 – 23 February 1545), comte d'Enghien.
- Madeleine de Bourbon (3 February 1520 –) abbess of Sainte-Croix de Poitiers.
- Louis de Bourbon (3 May 1522 – 25 June 1525).
- Charles de Bourbon (22 December 1523 – 9 May 1590), cardinal de Bourbon, king Charles X for the Catholic Ligue (League) from 1589 to 1590.
- Catherine de Bourbon (18 September 1525 – 27 April 1594), abbess of Notre-Dame de Soissons.
- Renée de Bourbon (6 February 1527 – 9 February 1583), abbess of Chelles.
- Jean de Bourbon (6 July 1528 – 10 August 1557), comte de Soissons then duc d'Estouteville, married Marie de Bourbon, duchesse d'Estouteville.
- Louis de Bourbon (7 May 1530 – 13 March 1569), prince de Condé, married twice: first, in 1551, to Éléonore de Roye (d. 1564); and then, in 1565, to Françoise d'Orléans (d.1601). He had eight children with his first wife and three with his second.
- Éléonore de Bourbon (18 January 1532 – 26 March 1611), abbess of Fontevraud.

During 1535, he sought a match for his daughter Marie with James, king of Scotland. Concurrently to this endeavour there was a royal project to see the Scottish king married to king Francis' daughter Madeleine de Valois. It was Francis' project, rather than Charles', that succeeded, though the royal marriage would be a brief one, due to the early death of Madeleine.

=== Incomes and property ===
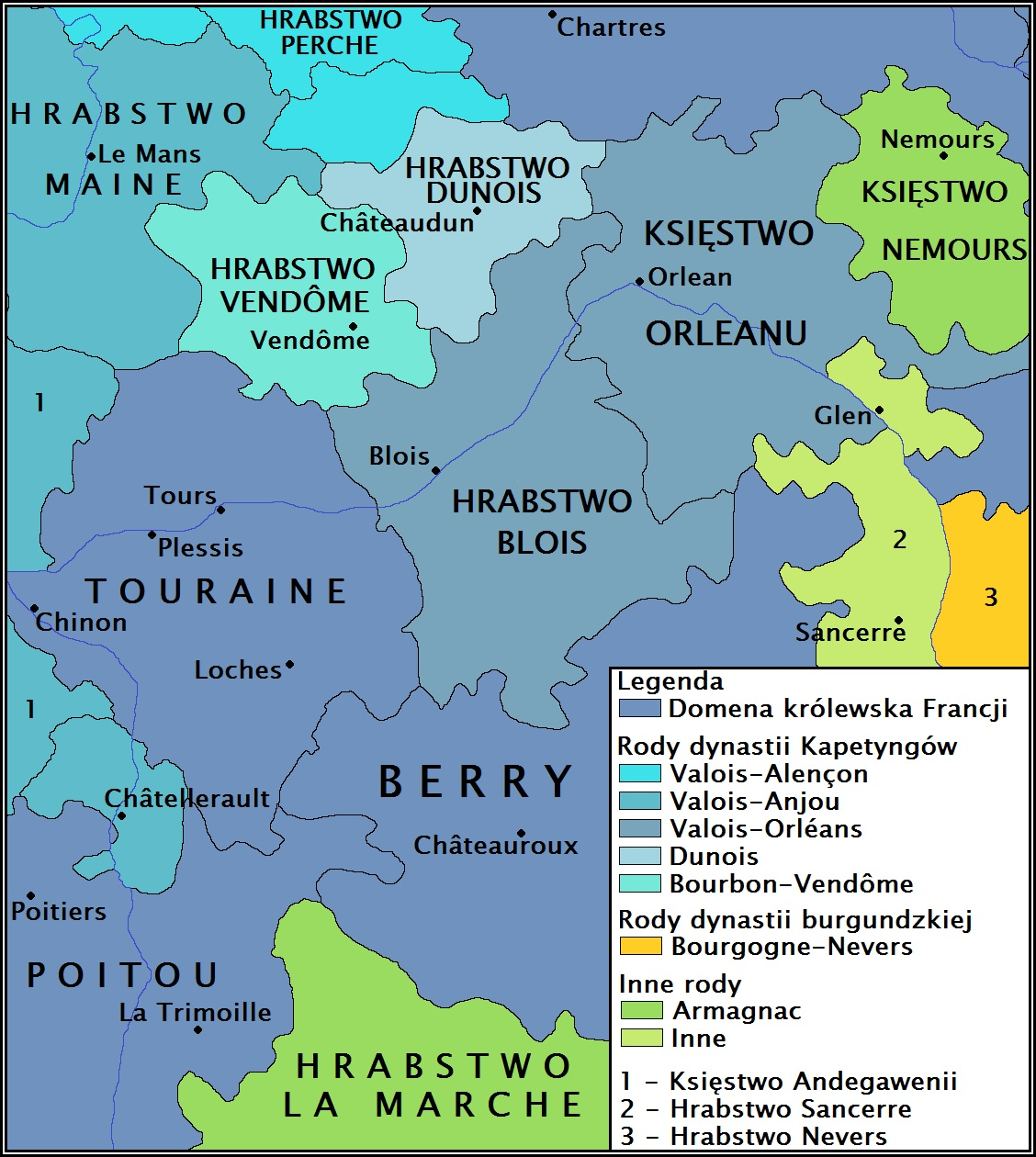
Map of the comté, then duché de Vendôme, written here as Hrabstwo Vendôme

The royal pensions enjoyed by the Bourbon-Vendôme grew from the figure of 2,000 livres in 1482 to 14,000 livres in 1525, then 24,000 by 1532 near to the end of Vendôme's life.

While there is much visible in the historical record for lines of credit extending from officers to 'grandees' (such as Vendôme), the historian Hamon argues our visibility of the reverse is far more obscure. He notes one such case in a loan made by Vendôme to a certain 'Jehan de La Forge' for a sum of 1,200 livres in 1524.

Charles possessed a 'beautiful' hôtel (grand town house) in Cambrai which would serve as a residence for the queen mother Louise during the negotiations of the Treaty of Cambrai in 1529.

=== Aristocratic connections ===
The Bourbon-Vendôme family, chief among them Charles served as the protectors of the du Bellay family which would rise to great prominence in the early sixteenth-century. The future cardinal Jean du Bellay would dedicate several works in his youth to the family.

In 1531, Guillaume du Bellay, seigneur de Langey, married Anne de Créquy of the important Picard noble family. Vendôme, the king Francis and the Grand Maître de Montmorency (Grand-Master Montmorency) all gave their blessing to the match.

Vendôme would enjoy strong ties with the vicomte de Thoaurs (viscount of Thouars), and the two would be companions in arms during the 1520s.

Vendôme would forge connections with the Picard house of Humières. Jean II d'Humières would act as a godfather to the princes son the comte d'Enghien.^{α}

The Italian explorer Giovanni da Verrazzano, in his travels along the North American coast, would name a topographical feature after Vendôme (as well as others after many other great French nobles).

=== Compagnies d'ordonnance ===
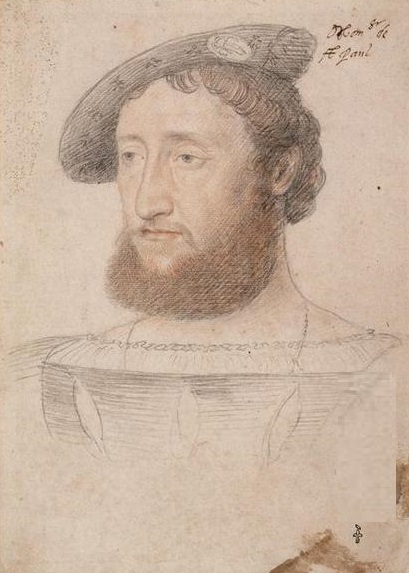
Vendôme's brother, François de Bourbon, comte de Saint-Pol

Both Vendôme, and his brother Saint-Pol would serve as capitaines for compagnies d'ordonnance (largely aristocratic companies of heavy cavalry that formed the building blocks of the royal army). Vendôme enjoyed the successive service of the seigneur de Vervins (who joined with his compagnie during Vendôme's service in Italy), the sieur de Canny (1523) the sieur de Moy and the sieur de Torcy as his lieutenants. The sieur de Moy was a subject of Vendôme's mother Marie for his baronnie. Torcy meanwhile, was entrusted with various special tasks by Vendôme such as the restitution of property under the terms of the treaty of Madrid in 1526.

== Reign of Louis XII ==
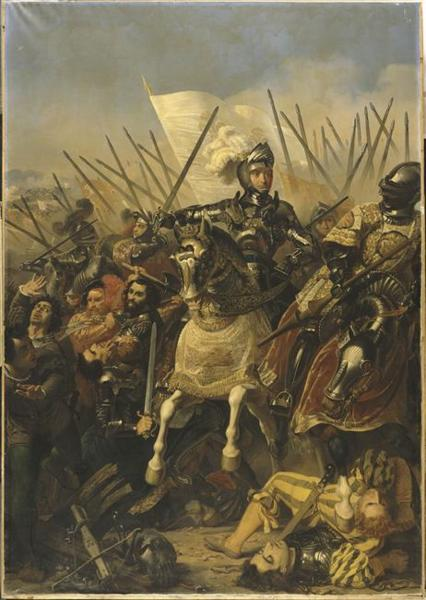
Battle of Agnadello at which the comte de Vendôme was knighted by king Louis XII

The comte de Vendôme (count of Vendôme) gained military experience in the campaigns of Louis XII. He participated in the siege of Genoa in 1507.

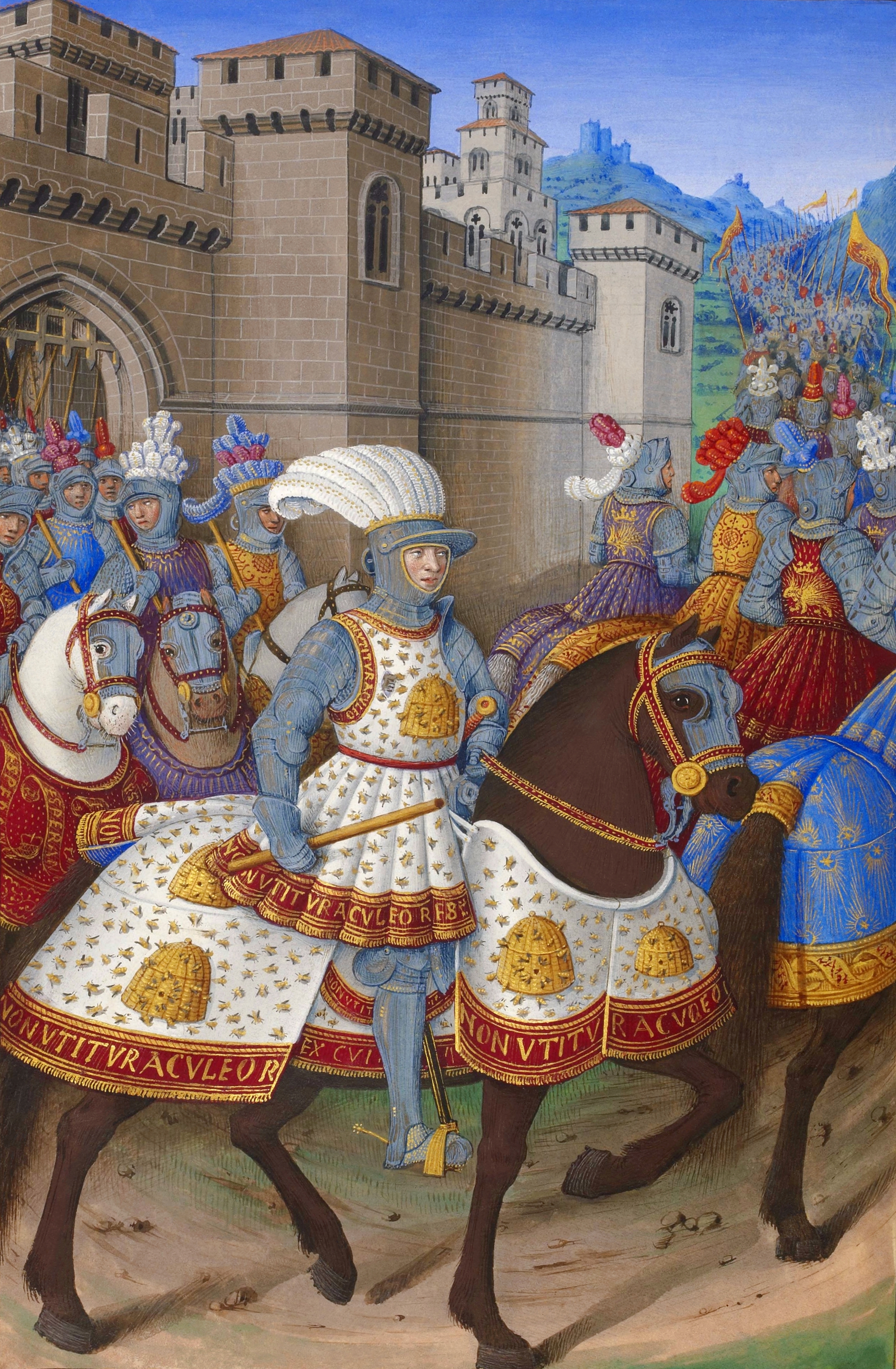
Louis XII leaving Alessandria to attack Genoa, on the horse behind him, with a red coat can be seen the comte de Vendôme, identifiable due to his motto espérance (hope) written on the livery.

The comte de Vendôme fought in the victory of Agnadello against the Venetians in 1509. At the battle he was knighted by Louis.

The queen of France, Anne died on 9 January 1514. Louis wished for to enjoy an elaborate funeral. During the period of mourning, Louis worked to prepare a new campaign into Italy, seeing opportunity in the weakness of the duca di Milano (duke of Milan).

During May, a marriage was celebrated between Louis' daughter Claude and the comte d'Angoulême. Concurrent to this he looked to negotiate a peace with England. One of the terms of this agreement was marriage between Louis and the young English princess Mary. The marriage was drawn up on 7 August, and she arrived in Calais on 3 October. The vicomte de Thouars (viscount of Thoaurs) and the sire d'Orval were dispatched to greet the princess. It would be the comte de Vendôme however who would receive her in the name of the king. She had an elaborate retinue with her, comprising two thousand horse and two thousand archers. Many of the greatest nobles of England were also among those with her, including the duke of Suffolk. Only a few days later on 11 October, the marriage would be celebrated.

=== Death of the king ===
After a period of agonies, Louis XII died in the late evening of Monday, 1 January 1515 in the hôtel des Tournelles (hôtel meaning a grand townhouse) in Paris.

His bedside was crowded by many of his faithful companions as well as princes du sang (agnatic male relatives of the king) including the comte de Vendôme, his brother the comte de Saint-Pol, the duc de Bourbon (duke of Bourbon), the comte de Dunois and the vicomte de Thouars . The bishop of Paris was also present, accompanied by mendicant friars and English officers.

On 10 January, the king's funeral was held in Paris. Behind the hearse walked four of the princes du sang: the duc d'Alençon (of the Valois-Alençon), the duc de Bourbon and the vicomte de Châtellerault (of the Bourbon-Montpensier) and the comte de Vendôme (of the Bourbon-Vendôme). On 11 January the funeral cortège proceeded to Saint-Denis for the burial ceremony.

In the absence of a son, Louis' cousin and son-in-law, the duc de Valois (formerly the comte d'Angoulême) succeeded to the throne, assuming the name Francis I. His ascent represented a continuity as opposed to a radical palace shakeup. The various officers of the crown were confirmed in their positions, from the parlements (most senior sovereign courts) to the governors. The new king lacked much in the way of a party of his own, and therefore the royal councils were occupied by many of the men who had been present during the reign of Louis: the comte de Vendôme, the duc de Bourbon, the duc d'Alençon, the vicomte de Châtellerault, the maréchal de Trivulzio (marshal of Trivulzio) who had participated in all Louis' campaigns and the duke of Albany who Louis had elevated to the marshalate in 1514.

Vendôme would be permitted by the new king to address the latter as 'monsieur'. According to Brantôme, when Vendôme's brother, the comte de Saint-Pol attempted to address the king likewise, he was told the privilege of this address extended only to Vendôme and not to he.

== Reign of Francis I ==
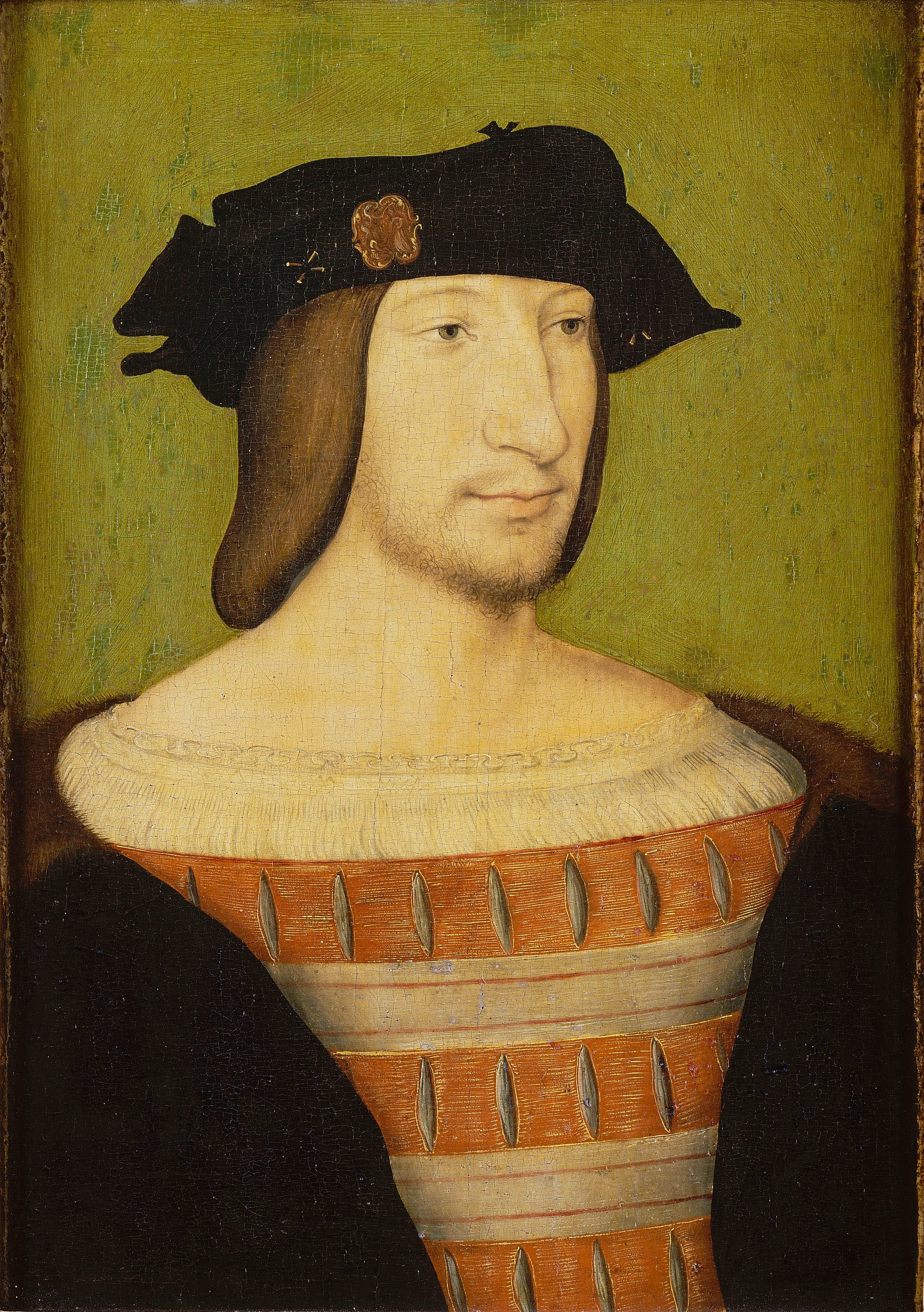
Francis I at the advent of his reign in 1515

=== Conseiller ===
During the reign of Louis XII, men of bourgeois extraction, like Étienne de Poncher, Jean de Ganay, Jacques de Beaune and Guillaume Briçonnet (respectively a bishop, the chancellor, and two généraux des finances - generals of the finances) had enjoyed places of influence on the conseil du roi. As the 1520s wore on, French nobles of prestigious pedigree began to usurp their place in royal affairs, with Vendôme one of them, alongside the comte de Guise, baron de Montmorency, and cardinal de Tournon among others.

In total, princes like the comte de Vendôme would comprise around 15% of the 33 noblesse d'épée (sword nobles - old nobility who associated their class with military service) on the council during the reign of Francis I.

The historian Michon argues that figures in council like Vendôme, the duc de Lorraine, and the connétable de Bourbon (connétable or Constable, most senior military office in the kingdom, he is also referred to by his title as the duc de Bourbon) were present on the royal councils primarily as a tool of legitimisation. Michon classifies Vendôme, by virtue of his status as a prince and later a duc as a born adviser to the crown. Thus, alongside other similar men like Alençon, the king of Navarre, the duc de Bourbon, and the cardinal de Bourbon they were frequently called to council, even if none of these men had political weight. These great men's illustrious signatures legitimised decisions in which they lacked either political influence or major involvement. Vendôme did not have a presence on the more exclusive conseil privé (privy council) outside of the crisis years of 1525-1526.

The historians Rentet and Michon have catalogued those figures present on the royal councils during the reign of Francis I, dividing the figures into principal members of the council, and those who were also present. Vendôme figures as a presence on the council during 1515-1516, 1518, 1524, 1527-1528, 1530, 1534 and 1537; in their estimation he is elevated to the rank of a principal person of the council during the crisis of 1525.

Francis quickly set to work distributing favours on those who had been close to him in his youth. The vicomte de Thouars received the admiralty of Guyenne and Brittany, the seigneur de Boisy (lord of Boisy) was made Grand Maître (great office of the crown and head of the king's household with various privileges), and the comte de Vendôme received the dual honour of being made governor of Paris and governor of the Île de France (the region around Paris). He acceded to the latter charge on 18 February.

As governor of the city of Paris, Vendôme was responsible for the defence of the city. He was one of the authorities who maintained order in the capital (alongside the parlement and the bureau de la Ville. Along with the parlement, Vendôme was a conduit for royal commands.

=== Governor of the capital ===
In February, after his coronation, Francis made a grand entry into Paris. Various spectacles were put on in the city to mark the occasion, including one where the king was represented in his regalia surrounded by two women one 'France', the other 'Faith'. Around these three figures were six armoured figures whose heraldry identified them as the duc d'Alençon, the duc de Bourbon and the comte de Vendôme. Further figures represented the common people, loyalty and vigilance. The display also featured a brief text concerning David's triumph over Goliath.

In March 1515, the comté de Vendôme (county of Vendôme) was elevated to the rank of a duché (duchy) by Francis as a reward for the prince's military service. This separated the territory from its dependant status on the duché d'Anjou, a matter which had long been a campaign of Vendôme's mother Marie. Concurrently Vendôme also became a pair (peer).

Vendôme undertook a diplomatic mission to Flanders in 1515 so that he might liaise with the lord of the Netherlands (the future Holy Roman Emperor Charles V). He was accompanied by the diplomat the seigneur de Langey whose services he may have recommended to the crown.

In the Autumn of 1515, the French had success in their military advance into Italy. The Imperial (i.e. Holy Roman) commander Colonna was bested by the maréchal de La Palice at Francavilla. The king and royal army followed La Palice over the Alps into Italy, and La Palice and the seigneur de Genouillac were ordered to capture Novara. Little desiring a sack, Novara surrendered to La Palice, and the maréchal was appointed governor of the city. At the Battle of Marignano, François achieved a capital success. Vendôme fought with the king in this battle, and his horse was wounded by pike blows in the combat. Writing to his mother Louise on the evening of the victory the king cited the presence of various nobles, among them Vendôme, his brother the comte de Saint-Pol, La Palice, and the comte de Guise. Vendôme's brother Saint-Pol would come in for particular praise for his valour, with Vendôme being considered a somewhat second rate commander by the king.

=== Concordat of Bologna ===
After this great triumph, it was subsequently agreed that a meeting would take place between Francis and Pope Leo X in Bologna. The Pope arrived for this meeting accompanied by many cardinals and soldiers on 8 December 1515. The king arrived three days later with a grand company. Francis and his chancellor Duprat emphasised their devotion and loyalty to the Pope, alongside the king's willingness to lay down all that he had in service of the Pope. Through one of his cardinals, the Pope thanked Francis, and named him the eldest son of the church, a recent title which had first been granted to Charles VIII in 1495. Francis' predecessor Louis XII had not been granted the title. The two men then got down to business, discussing plans for a crusade against the Ottomans, the claims of the French crown to the kingdom of Naples, and in particular the supersession of the Pragmatic Sanction (1438 agreement by which the French church became largely autonomous from the Pope) with a new Concordat. Duprat would spend several days working on the nature of this Concordat with the cardinals (Ancona and Santi-Quatro). The various ambassadors in Bologna were troubled by the new alliance between the Pope and France. Francis worked to reassure those of Spain, Venice, the Swiss cantons and Portugal. The Pope would do likewise. After a supper, debate took place on the nature of the Concordat, with Francis affable on many points. In return for his generosity, the Pope conceded to withdraw his troops from Verona on condition of Venice being prohibited from returning to Ravenna and Cervia. At Francis' request on 13 December, the Pope raised the brother of the Grand Maître to the cardinalate. In the evening Francis and the Pope dined alongside the duc de Bourbon, the duc de Vendôme and three cardinals. The Pope agreed to remove a censure on the French clergy, and in return Francis granted the release of the condotierri (originally a term denoting mercenary captains but broadened over time to all Italian commanders) captain Colonna and a postponement of his campaign into Naples. He was more vague on his commitments as concerned a crusade.

On 14 December, Francis departed Bologna, content in the success of his mission. He had secured leadership of the potential crusade, been granted the title of 'eldest son of the church' and strengthened his alliance with the Papacy. The Pope for his part could feel happy to have subordinated the French to the Roman church through the establishment of the Concordat (which he anticipated would replace the Pragmatic Sanction), delayed any French aggression against Naples and incubated the possibility of a crusade. Vendôme and the comte de Guise led an embassy to the Doge of Venice to inform him of the outcome of the meeting in Bologna. The rough Concordat of Bologna that had been negotiated took the following form: elections to ecclesiastical benefices were to be suppressed. In their stead, the king would nominate within six months of a vacancy opening, either a university graduate or a nobleman of the age 27 or more for churches. This candidate would then receive the approval of the Pope. Milan was de facto recognised as a French territory, and he was given permission to have the décime (tithe - one tenth religious tax) raised at a rate of his discretion, as long as part of the sum went to Rome to fund the building of the Basilica di San Pietro. The sovereign authority of the Papacy was to be recognised absolutely. Various other smaller matters were also discussed.

A mock battle was staged at Amboise in April 1518, with six hundred men under the command of Francis and the duc d'Alençon commanding the defence of a model town. Leading the attack in this staged combat were the duc de Bourbon and duc de Vendôme, each commanding an equal number of soldiers. The combat received praise of the seigneur de Fleuranges. The mock combat nevertheless terrified some and resulted in the deaths of others.

== Frontier governor ==
=== Governor of Picardy ===
In December 1519, upon the death of the seigneur de Piennes, Vendôme acceded to the position of governor of Picardy. On 16 December 1519, the duc de Vendôme was relieved of his charge as governor of the Île de France. With some brief interludes, he would hold the charge of governor of Picardy until his death. The Île de France was handed over to his brother the comte de Saint-Pol who became governor the same day. Unlike other grandee governors such as Montmorency, who was rarely to be found in his charge of Languedoc, Vendôme would spend much time in Picardy during his governorship. In particular, according to the analysis of the historian Potter, Vendôme spent the majority of time in Picardy (either in the province generally or his seigneuries such as La Fère) every year from 1520 to his death with the exceptions of 1525-1526, 1530, 1533 and 1534. There would be significant military coordination between the governates of Picardy and his former charge of the Île de France after 1521.

Due to the quasi-royal nature of the office of governor, great ceremonial entries were made for when the governor first visited a town. This was the case for Vendôme in Abbeville in February 1520 several barrels of wine were prepared for the occasion, the armed companies of the town made ready to greet him. Subsequently the keys were formally presented to Vendôme.

For the first two years of his administration of Picardy, he would have no deputy governor in Picardy. As far as the captaincies of the greater towns of his province were concerned, many were quasi-hereditary. For example Amiens was captained by three generations of the Lannoy family from 1495 to 1562. In Beauvais, the baron de Montmorency was succeeded in 1515 by his son the sieur de La Prune au Pot (later to take the name of the sieur de La Rochepot). Saint-Quentin was handed through members of the Mouy family and Abbeville by several generations of the Haucourt de Huppy Family. Montreuil was held by the sieur de Pont-Rémy who would serve as Vendôme's deputy in the coming years. In addition to generational occupation, proximity to Vendôme could also secure nobles their town governorships. For example a noble named Montbrun of his household was established as governor of the town of Guise in 1527.

He quickly aroused the umbrage of the grandees of Beauvais when he sought to install a garrison of 50 lances in the city. They rebuked him for this claiming they were not part of his Picard government but rather that of the Île de France. Thus, they sent a deputation to Saint-Pol. Saint-Pol responded to the delegation that the king would make Vendôme understand Beauvais was not under his authority and relieve them of the garrison. This would not be the end of the dispute between Beauvais and Vendôme. In May 1524, he again tried to garrison the city much to their chagrin. Nevertheless, when legionaries caused havoc around Beauvais in 1536, they appealed to Vendôme to relieve them of their depredations.

The consuls of Tournai attempted to circumvent Vendôme's intermediary authority in 1521 and make an appeal straight to the king. Vendôme expressed his great frustration to them after this episode, suggesting it implied to him that they did not trust him.

=== La Fayette dispute ===
In the early summer of 1521, Vendôme also fell into a dispute with the seigneur de La Fayette who had served as the governor/captain of Boulogne since 1513. Vendôme charged the governor with having undertaken raids of Burgundy without permission. He argued that Thérouanne needed supplies before it could be engaged on an offensive footing. La Fayette's actions had been reported to him by the government of Montreuil, and in August the prince wrote to La Fayette prohibiting him from selling any loot he might have acquired. La Fayette was vexed by these chastisements and escalated the dispute to court, sending a representative that accused Vendôme and the maréchal de La Palice of not being honest in their concerns, arguing that their prime opposition to him came from their fears of losing their Burgundian territories once war began. He went on to say that Vendôme was jealous of the governors three ships, that had been equipped as the seigneurs expense. La Fayette would ask to be relieved of his governorship in 1522, and it was provided to the seigneur du Biez who subsequently usurped La Fayette's control of the broader sénéchaussée (region subject to the jurisdiction of a sénéchal - seneschal) in January 1523. La Fayette was close with Vendôme's cousin the connétable de Bourbon, whose treasonous dealings were already suspected at this time. Potter speculates this might be the cause of his dismissal from the latter charge.

In April 1521, the duc de Bourbon's wife Suzanne died. She had willed all her property to her husband. King Francis and his mother Louise were determined to frustrate the succession of her territories.^{β}

=== Campaign of 1521 ===
Relevant towns in Picardy for the Franco-Imperial war in 1521, blue marked locations were subject to an Imperial siege or sack, orange marked locations were subject to a French siege or sack
Relevant towns in Champagne for the Franco-Imperial war in 1521, blue marked locations were subject to an Imperial siege or sack

During the campaign season of 1521, Francis snubbed the connétable de Bourbon by denying him command of the army for Italy, the most prestigious command, granting the honour to the vicomte de Lautrec. Bourbon was instead put in charge of the army in Champagne. Francis furthered this snub by installing Vendôme at his side, in a role Jacquart describes as being like that of a supervisor.

The military endeavours of the summer went poorly for Francis. For want of money his plans had either ended in defeat or postponement. There was now a risk that Mézières, in Champagne would fall to the Imperial army, and with its fall much of Picardy would be opened to the forces of the Emperor. Such an eventuality was not tolerable. The Imperial army, under the command of the graaf van Nassau subdued Mouzon before turning its attention to the capture of Mézières.

Francis, keen to avoid this eventuality, saw to it that 2,000 men were dispatched into Mézières at the end of August, most notable among them being the maréchal de Montmorency, the famed captain the seigneur de Bayard, and the future amiral de France the seigenur d'Annebault. The city was put to siege by the Imperial army whose formidable artillery set to work on the walls. Though the city initially resisted well, food quickly ran low, and disease spread. Thus, the king, operating out of Reims, ordered the cities resupply. At this time, Francis was also assembling a large force in Reims, sending out orders to the gendarmerie of Burgundy and men of his household to come to the city. Further to this Vendôme was to gather 10,000 infantry and 200 cavalry around Saint-Quentin and Laon, and the duc de Bourbon to join with the king in Reims at the head of roughly another six thousand infantry and 200 cavalry. A small force bringing supplies under the command of Vendôme's brother the comte de Saint-Pol arrived on 23 September, dashing the hope of the Imperials to subjugate the city by starvation alone. Conditions outside the walls were just as dire as inside, and not long after, on 25 September, the Imperial force was ordered to make a retreat from the city. In addition to the poor conditions, Nassau was aware of the imminent arrival of a large royal army under Francis' command.

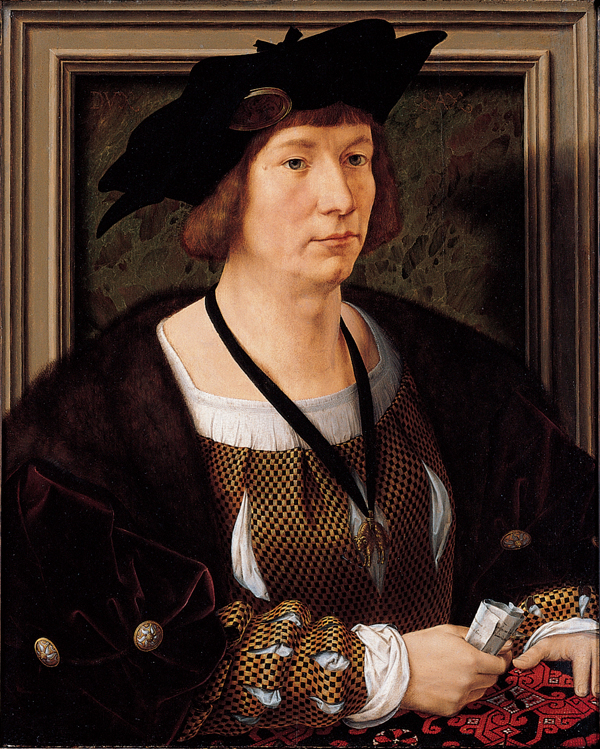
Graaf van Nassau, Imperial commander on the northern frontier

In August 1521, Vendôme wrote to the secrétaire Robertet requesting that he be affirmed in the right of a governor to allocate territories confiscated from the kingdoms enemies. He cited the example of the maréchal d'Esquerdes who had enjoyed this right during the conflicts of 1477. By this means, Vendôme would have the power to both assure himself of his own compensation and those of his loyal followers.

As was the custom for the provisioning of frontier forces, Vendôme made demands of supplies from the towns of Picardy. This would be followed in October 1521 with requests for more wine and bread. Beauvais was to provide 50,000 loaves of bread in September, and Abbeville to provide 10,000 loaves a day until he told them otherwise. Such demands could generate protest, as in April 1524 when Chauny noted that if it provided its grain supplies there would be none left for the people of the town. In the 1530s, Vendôme and La Rochepot had to assail the towns with their requests for supplies. For example, on 3 July 1536 he demanded 4000 loaves a day from Chauny, the town protested and he altered his request to 3000 loaves a day and five pieces of wine for the soldiers encamped at Assis-sur-Serre. With nothing coming still, Vendôme chastised the town and reverted his request to 4,000 loaves. Come the end of July no bread had been provided from Chauny. The governor of Chauny thus informed the town of Vendôme's anger on 11 August and the supplies were brought north.

On 4 October, Francis was at Attigny where he reviewed his Swiss troops. The intention was for them to march to the relief of Tournai, which was under Imperial siege. However, the weather turned, and there was torrential rains. This, coupled with the destruction caused by Nassau's retreat frustrated progress.

Success in front of Mézières proved a welcome morale boost for the French army after a difficult summer. Francis looked to seize the initiative and put himself at the head of an army of 30,000 men to lead a pursuit of the retreating Nassau. The Imperial commander was moving towards Montcornet with the intention of besieging Guise.

The duc de Vendôme was dispatched to occupy Vervins so that he might impede the Imperial retreat. Vendôme's brother seized back Mouzon on 3 October (which had previously fallen to Nassau). Nassau now changed his plans, and after putting Aubenton to the sword, he made for Estrées, carving a path of destruction in his wake. Despite the French successes on the Picard frontier, and in the south of the kingdom (where the amiral de Bonnivet was profiting), the Emperor would not countenance establishing a truce or a peace with the French. He opined that until such time as France returned to him Dauphiné, Burgundy, Provence, Montpellier, Asti, Milan and parts of Roussillon, there could not be a peace. This was in itself a moderation of his claim to the entire kingdom of France, that he asserted was his by right of a Papal decision in 1303. The Emperor's ally, the English were less bullish about their prospects, and looked to obtain a several year truce.

From camp at Origny on 12 October, Francis responded to the English truce proposals. A truce would be granted only if it included the entire coalition, lasted four to five years, compelled the Emperor not to visit Italy, provide money to the king of Naples, return the kingdom of Navarre to its despoiled king and saw to it that the Emperor reaffirm his intentions to marry his daughter Charlotte de Valois.

With these terms quite impossible, Francis and the French army set off in pursuit of Nassau. On 19 October, in battle formation, they marched towards Valenciennes. According to the historian Le Fur, the duc d'Alençon led the vanguard, the king and Bourbon were in the battle, and the duc de Vendôme led the rear-guard. It was traditional to assign the vanguard to the connétable. According to Hamon, Bourbon was with Vendôme in the rear-guard. He adds that Bourbon was doubly aggrieved both by his lack of command and that his tactical advice was ill listened to. After receiving troubling reports that those in Bapaume were engaged in troubles, Francis dispatched the comte de Saint-Pol, the seigneur de Fleuranges and the maréchal de La Palice to Bapaume, which they stormed and then torched and razed. Vendôme replicated his brothers treatment of Bapaume at Landrecies on 22 October, razing the settlement.

With the French army now in Imperial territory, the Emperor had resolved to meet the invaders on the field. By 22 October he was at Valenciennes. In the opinion of Knecht, the French had the opportunity at this time to strike a major blow against the Imperials. The possibility of making battle was considered by the French, and to this end a bridge over the Scheldt was to be constructed. The Emperor dispatched 16,000 men to interfere with this work, but they found the comte de Saint-Pol's men already in battle order, and the French vanguard not far behind him. Debate now followed as to whether to engage in battle, with the duc de Bourbon, the vicomte de Thouars and the maréchal de La Palice in favour, and the maréchal de Coligny among those who opposed. Francis sided with those who were against giving battle. That night, the Emperor withdrew from Valenciennes with 100 light horse. Despite his opposition to battle, Francis permitted his captains to pursue the Imperial force towards Valenciennes.

The French commanders set about securing the surrounds of Valenciennes: the duc de Bourbon seized Bouchain and the duc de Vendôme surprised Somain.

Meanwhile, Nassau's army moved off to join the siege of Tournai. Rather than relieve Tournai, the royal forces burned the town of Hesdin despite the wealth that the French troops fancied in the town. The châteaux de Renty and Bailleul-Mont were also seized by the French.

On 1 November, the king began the retreat towards Arras, and the royal army was disbanded for the winter on 9 November at Amiens.

Come mid November, Francis had withdrawn to Compiègne where he reunited with the queen and Louise. His failure to give battle was a source of some embarrassment, as not only had he declined it before Valenciennes, but several days later when offered battle before Bouchain by the graaf van Nassau, he had again refused it. In addition to these failures, negotiations with England were struggling to progress (with the looming threat of the English king Henry VIII joining with the Emperor in military alliance in November if the French king did not reach an agreement with the Imperial party by that time). and at the end of November, Tournai fell to the Imperial army besieging the city. Compounding this reversal, on 24 November, the English signed the treaty of Bruges by which they committed to join with the Emperor in war against France in 1522. The French texts of the campaign limited themselves to describing the places conquered and the destruction wrought.

=== Spring campaign against the Imperials ===
Picard towns of relevance in the campaign of 1522, orange markers denote territories owned or conquered by the Anglo-Imperial alliance, blue markers denote Vendôme's strong points where he concentrated his garrisons

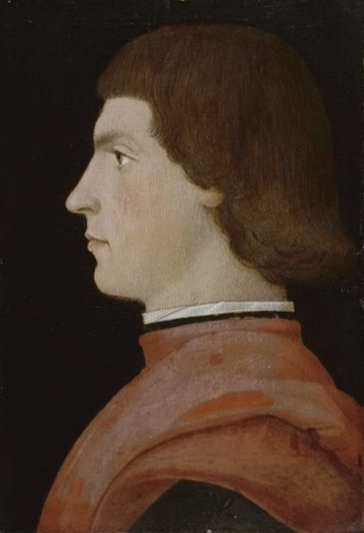
Vicomte de Thouars, who worked towards the defence of Picardy alongside (and in 1523 temporarily replaced) Vendôme

While the vicomte de Thouars yearned to be granted the prestigious responsibility of leading the campaign to reclaim Milan for France in the spring of 1522, he was instead ordered to join with Vendôme so that they might both protect Picardy against the newly formed Anglo-Imperial coalition.

In the spring campaign of 1522, a raid from Arras was foiled by the men of the seigneur d'Estrées who caused the Imperial party to return to their starting point empty handed. This reverse occasioned a new imperial action, with Doullens (of which Estrées was the protector) put to siege on 19 March. Vendôme, based out of Amiens, implored his brother Saint-Pol to gather 2,000 Swiss soldiers who were garrisoning Abbeville and lead them to Doullens. The Swiss troops would however refuse to fight, citing lack of pay, and they returned to the mountains. Thus, Saint-Pol instead demanded 1,000 soldiers from Hesdin. With this troop assembled, the besiegers of Doullens were scattered.

Come the end of April, various bands on the border, for want of food, were causing havoc for Vendôme. He resolved on a radical solution, having several fortresses razed, and putting the land to fire around Arras. Once Vendôme had returned to Doullens he was appraised of the movements of an English army. Henry VIII was assembling a force at Dover intending to land in Calais.

=== War with England ===
Relations between the two crowns had been difficult since the collapse of negotiations between the crowns in 1521. Nevertheless, Francis had not entirely cast down the prospect of attempting friendship with the English king. Though Francis was interested in friendship, he had not paid the money he owed to the English crown since May 1521. He had further cut off the pensions that were afforded to several English princes, including the duke of Norfolk and the cardinal Wolsey. After complaints from the English king, in January 1522, Francis assured Henry he would abide by his promises. February came and went without payment, Francis writing to Henry, characterising the Emperor as the aggressor in the Franco-Imperial conflict, and asking for the English king's support.

On 23 May, the Holy Roman Emperor was to be found in Bruges. He travelled to Dunkerque on 24 May, then Calais the day after. He was at Dover on 26 May where he met with the cardinal Wolsey and soon thereafter the English king. He would spend the next month in England before embarking for Iberia in July. During his stay in the country, Henry promised a combined invasion of France prior to May 1523, and an English expeditionary force prior to August 1522.

On 28 May, Henry's representative, Thomas Cheney met with Francis in Lyon. In the hopes of securing his money, a truce was again proposed (for Francis to make with the Imperials), and if Francis would refuse this, Henry would assume his claim to be the protector of the Imperial Low Countries and declare war on the king.

The day after, 29 May, Henry's declaration of war was read to Francis by a herald: the English king complained of the unpaid debts, breaches of the treaty of London, French aggressions against the Emperor, French support for the duke of Albany (an enemy of Henry's in Scotland). Francis allegedly delivered a quick and scornful response in which he assured that the English would quickly tire of waging war.

=== Anglo-Imperial campaign ===
The ban and arrière-ban (service levies on the nobility) were ordered raised in Normandy. The vicomte de Thouars, who had been appointed as Vendôme's deputy in the province during May, departed for Picardy with 2,000 men to supplement Vendôme's forces in the province and reorganise the urban defences. Vendôme's Picard army was still too small to effectively control the whole province, and therefore he concentrated his men on Hesdin, Boulogne, Thérouanne, Montreuil and Abbeville. Meanwhile, he abandoned other sites that were less defensible, such as Ardres. Across Boulogne, Thérouanne, Hesdin, Montreuil and Abbeville the garrisons numbered 12,700 infantry and 705 members of the gendarmerie, with Vendôme and the vicomte de Thouars based out of Abbeville.

From July the English menaced the Breton coast and reeked devastation. Francis resolved to raise a new tax of 2,400,000 livres to resist the English intrusions into Brittany without having to deprive the edges of Flanders, Artois, Guyenne and Provence which were equally threatened of their soldiery - something he would have to do without access to these new funds.

Poor weather delayed the English arrival, allowing the French to take the initiative, putting Bapaume to the torch, and pillaging and burning villages across Artois to compromise the ability to supply forces in the region. This accomplished the soldiers returned to their garrison towns. Even slower than the English soldiers were their supplies. Vendôme's brother Saint-Pol and the comte de Guise were tasked with containing the English force and they advanced to Desvres and Samer before the English were reunited with their supplies.

In Picardy, the earl of Surrey and duke of Suffolk took command of the English forces. They marched out of Calais in September, looking to provoke the French into battle. Linking up with the graaf van Buren (count of Buren) they easily conquered the area between Saint-Omer and Ardres. This was accomplished with few fruits however, and their destruction of the Boulonnais countryside failed to induce Vendôme to battle, the prince simply rebuking the English for their 'foul warfare'. Thérouanne, where the seigneur de Brion was holding up with parts of his compagnie d'ordonnance, was put to siege by the English. Vendôme was ordered by the king to relieve the siege. The seigneur de Brion would see to the resupply of Thérouanne while Vendôme held up in Audincthun.

The English-Imperial army then looked to strike at Hesdin, seeing it as the weak link in the defended royal chain of towns. Their batteries set to work on Hesdin, and, despite the efforts of the comte de Guise and a certain Pontdormy after fifteen days, they made a breach. Despite this success, no assault through the breach would be ordered, bad weather and the ferocity of the skirmishes persuading them to disengage in favour of an attack on Doullens, which was torched (along with all the surrounding villages). Saint-Pol had seen Doullens as a liability and had ransacked its food store and pulled down its gate so that he might move to Corbie.

Vendôme shadowed the Anglo-Flemish Imperial army towards the Somme, supported by a force under the maréchal de Montmorency. By the time of All Saints' Day, 1 November, the troops were exhausted, and the rains had been unceasing. The invading coalition army retired to Artois for the winter.

In Le Fur's opinion, the Anglo-Imperial invasion of 1522 had failed to achieve any major conquest, succeeding only in spreading panic across the north of France.

Concurrently to the campaign of Autumn 1522, the connétable de Bourbon had fostered his contacts with the crowns of England and the Holy Roman Empire. Vendôme's brother Saint-Pol worked over the winter to reconcile Bourbon with Francis.

=== Calm before the storm ===
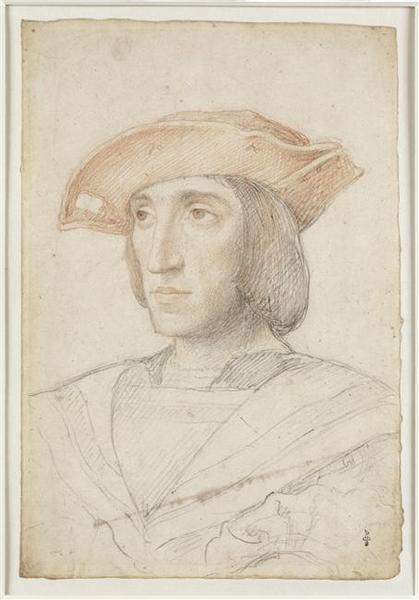
Possible sketch of the duc de Bourbon, otherwise known as the connétable de Bourbon

In March 1523, the connétable de Bourbon was tasked by the king with undertaking a police mission to suppress various bands of rebes in the Champagne, Brie and Burgundy. Vendôme, Saint-Pol and the vicomte de Thouars were entrusted with working with him on this operation. Bourbon also oversaw the resupplying of Thérouanne in the company of the Vendôme brothers.

Just before Easter 1523, the campaign in the north began again with a Flemish army numbering around 12,000 making an attempt on the town of Guise. The seigneur de Fleuranges commanded the nearby royal army, but Francis did not wish to give battle. Fleuranges withdrew to near Sedan on the border, and Vendôme was tasked with seeing Thérouanne kept in supply. The town was menaced by Imperial forces lodged in Audincthun and Delettes. Vendôme boasted a force of around 4,000 landsknechts, roughly equivalent numbers of Picard soldiers, strong artillery and 500 hommes d'armes. He took charge of the road to Saint-Omer to strangle Imperial supplies and soon caused the Flemish army to scatter. He pursued the retreating Flemings along the Scheldt river repeatedly skirmishing with them, while tasking the seigneur de Brion with bringing food supplies into Thérouanne from Montreuil.

The defence of Picardy was a concern on Vendôme's mind in June. Vendôme looked to bolster the defences of Thérouanne in particular. To this end the acquisition of oats, salt and other provisions were made that required the requisitioning of horses from as far away as Normandy to bring into the town. This provisioning effort cost around 6,500 livres. This sum was paid for by the king's secrétaire, upon Vendôme's instruction.

Francis showed little apprehension about affairs on the northern frontier, viewing the Flemings as poor soldiers, and the English as insufficiently numerous to pose a threat. He declared the counties of Flanders and Artois to be confiscated from the Emperor and then ordered the blockading of the Calais harbour. The duke of Albany was tasked with entering Scotland and making war with the English as soon as possible on their northern frontier, to which end he was granted 100,000 livres. These security decisions taken, he thus felt comfortable peeling off much of Vendôme's forces in the province, leaving him with only 2,000 infantry and 780 lances, so that he might employ the rest for the kingdom's Italian campaign. The maréchal de Montmorency took much of Vendôme's former army south to Lyon.

=== Treason ===
By the summer of 1523, word was reaching the queen mother Louise of the nefarious intentions of the connétable de Bourbon. On 26 July, a certain capitaine named La Clayette informed her that Bourbon had installed 50 hommes d'armes (men-at-arms) in his fortified holdings of Chantelle and Carlat and was mustering victuals and artillery. Bourbon had during July reached an agreement with the Emperor to marry the latter's sister and to betray France at the moment that England and the Empire invaded the kingdom.

With an understanding of Bourbon's coming betrayal now established, royal suspicion fell on many others. Vendôme was a particular focus of royal concern. Both the Emperor and his aunt Margarete, the regent of the Netherlands often discussed the clients and allies of Bourbon who they imagined might follow him in his treason. Chief among the names they floated were the duc de Lorraine, the king of Navarre and the Bourbon-Vendôme brothers (Vendôme and Saint-Pol). Moreover, both Vendôme and Saint-Pol were close with the connétable. Both their fathers had served as companions in arms during the early Italian Wars. The two families were also linked by marriage. The historian Michon sees the fact that the king would suspect one of his closest favourites (by which is meant Vendôme's brother Saint-Pol) of treason as indicative of the state of the court in 1523.

In a state of alert, the crown dispatched the vicomte de Thouars to Picardy so that he could engage a watchful eye over Vendôme, lest he prove sympathetic to his cousin's treason. Thouars had a particularly notable contempt for the connétable de Bourbon, making him ideal for the mission. In addition to the Vendôme component of his mission, his travel to Picardy would allow him to assure himself of the defensiveness of the province. Though he had a great hostility for the connétable, the vicomte enjoyed warm relations with the duc de Vendôme, and he thus protested to the king the fact he was to replace him. The suspected prince, Vendôme was recalled to the court in Lyon in August.

While staying at Gien, where he had arrived on 12 August, the king made two declarations. Firstly that he was going to campaign in Italy, so that he might secure 'his duchy' (i.e. Milan). The second declaration, a connected one, was that in his absence his mother Louise would serve as regent of the kingdom, as she had done in 1515. Her regency was ratified by the parlement on 7 September. During the king's stay in the city, the seigneur de La Vauguyon cryptically informed him of what he was aware of concerning Bourbon's plan. Francis is supposed to have replied that were he as paranoid as Louis XI he would have considerable reason to suspect the connétable.

While on the road to Moulins on 16 August, Francis received confirmation of the treasonous dealings of the duc de Bourbon. On 15 August, his mother Louise had received confirmation of the plot in a letter from the comte de Maulévrier (who was the sénéchal of Normandy, and the son-in-law of one of the conspirators, the seigneur de Saint-Vallier). She had promptly written to her son with the information. He had informed the queen mother that a great noble of royal blood was plotting with the kingdom's enemies, and Francis' life was in danger. A few days previous, Francis had been appraised of contacts Bourbon had with the English agent Jerningham.

Francis visited the connétable at Moulins, where the latter was convalescing with a fever. He did not imply any awareness of the duc de Bourbon's betrayal, and was assured by the latter that he intended to join with the king for the campaign into Italy. Francis departed, but left Bourbon under the eye of the seigneur de Warthy.

From Lyon, on 5 September, Francis struck against the conspirators. He ordered the arrest of Saint-Vallier, Aymar de Prie and the bishop of Le Puy. His suspicions of Vendôme meant that the prince had been recalled from his governate of Picardy in August (leaving Thouars in charge) so that Vendôme might be at his side. The prince was charged with assisting his cousin, the duc d'Alençon in suppressing any potential rebellions that arose in the Bourbonnais and Auvergne.

After his meeting with the king, Bourbon retired to his château de Chantelle, still nominally under the cloud of his illness. By now this was a ruse, and he was preparing to depart the kingdom. On 7 September he wrote letters to many major personages of the kingdom, including the king, and Louise. He offered apologetics for his actions as being justified, arguing he only sought to take what was rightfully his. That night he made his flight from Chantelle and out of France. Though it is difficult for historians to reconstruct his movements over the coming weeks, on 9 October he was in Besançon, then in Italy in December.

The maréchal de La Palice and the comte de Tende had been instructed to make for Chantelle to locate the connétable. However, by the time of their arrival, he had since fled, and they were unable to pursue, not knowing where he had gone.

It was now time for the king to make his response official. On 11 September he wrote a letter urging the bonnes villes (good towns of France) to maintain their loyalty to the crown. A large bounty of 20,000 écus was also offered for the parties who would hand over the rebel duc de Bourbon to the king.

In this dramatic moment, Francis did not feel in a position to lead his army that was due to cross the Alps into Italy as he had planned. Therefore, command was given to the amiral de Bonnivet. The first contingents crossed the Alps at the end of the summer.

Though his suspicion may have lingered on Vendôme and Saint-Pol for several weeks in the wake of the revelations of Bourbon's betrayal, it quickly passed as it became clear both brothers would remain in their loyalty to the king. Francis therefore was quick to affirm his trust in them both. In October, Vendôme departed for Paris in the company of the bishop of Aix, and the seigneur de Brion to declare that the king had entrusted him with the security of the capital. He was before the parlememt of the capital on 5 November.

=== English chevauchée ===
Places of relevance for Suffolk's chevauchée

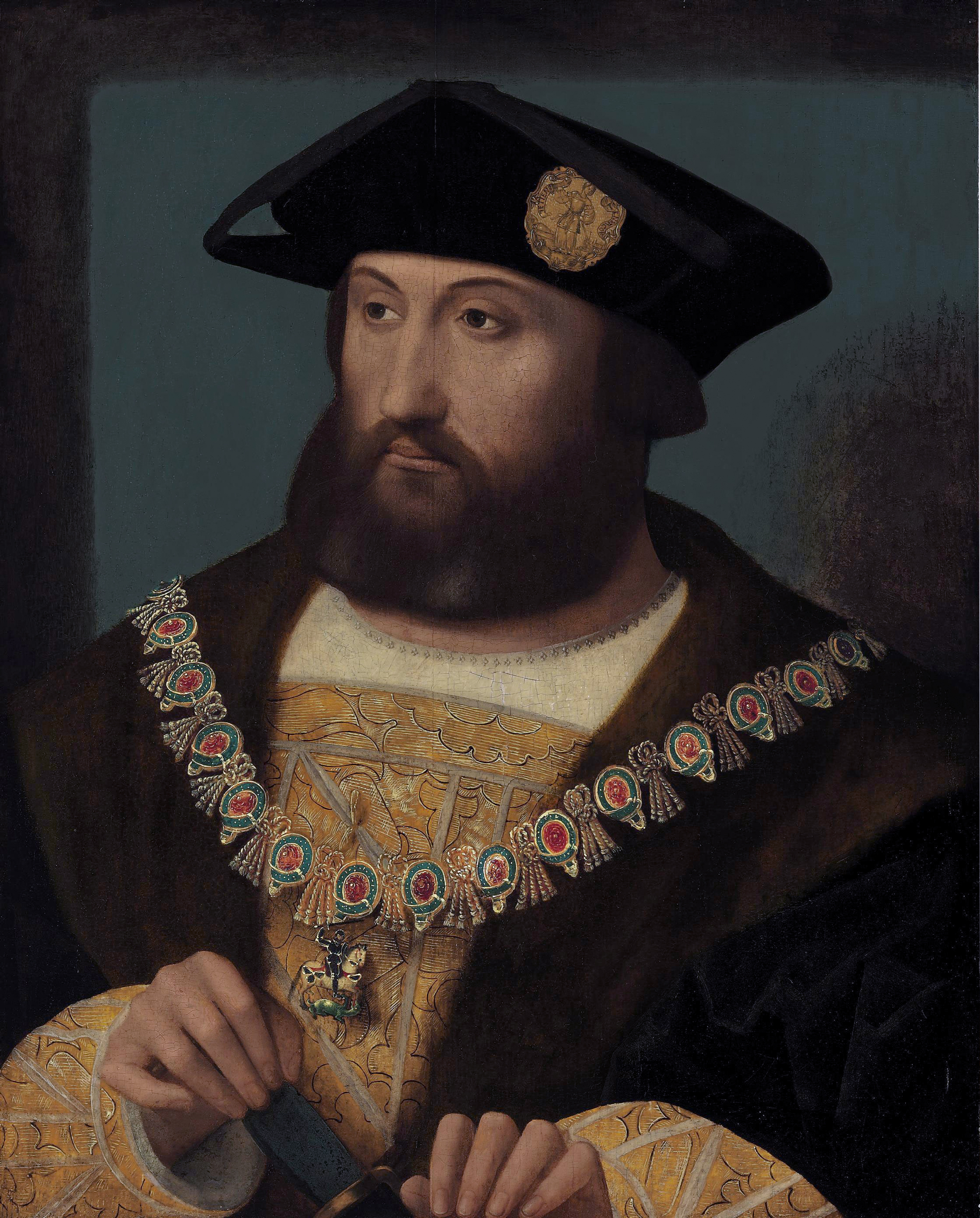
Duke of Suffolk who would lead the Anglo-Imperial campaign into the north of France

The situation had not remained calm in the north. The duke of Suffolk landed with an army of 15,000 in Calais sometime in July. He linked up with the soldiers under the command of the graaf van Buren as the English had the prior year. This combined force made for Hesdin. To the peasants around Ancre he made a warm offer, inviting them to bring supplies in with promises of safe conduct. By this means he secured markets to sell his army food. The vicomte de Thouars, who was serving as the new lieutenant-général of Picardy, had placed the seigneur de Fresnoy and the seigneur de Pierrepont in Hesdin with 2,000 soldiers. The coalition army would not stop at Hesdin however, marching first to Doullens and then Corbie (where Thouars was based) before passing this in turn. The manpower situation Thouars was faced with was dire and he was forced to juggle his limited soldiers to ensure they were placed in the towns in front of the army of invasion. In mid October, the coalition force seized and plundered the towns of Roye and Montdidier. These yielded significant riches to the sackers.

In late October, the army was now within 50 kilometres of Paris, and was rumoured to be eyeing attacks on Compiègne, Breteuil and Clermont, Oise. On 24 October 1523, Vendôme was restored to possession of the governate of the Île de France, to hold it in parallel with that of Picardy. In his absences from this second governate in the coming years, the power of governor was wielded by the archbishop of Aix. With this new authority at his disposal, Vendôme was thus dispatched to the capital. Several taxes were demanded of the bourgeois to raise a company of archers and fortify the suburbs (an action directed by the seigneur de Brion). Chains were raised across the streets. The two men (Brion and Vendôme) had visited the suburbs facing Suffolk's army several times before resolving on fortifying them. The coalition army soon became aware of Vendôme's presence in the capital, and with him out front, and the vicomte de Thouars behind, they began to fear being sandwiched between them. They thus began a retreat towards Saint-Quentin. Nesle was put to the torch as they retreated, with the army concluding its march in Artois, where Suffolk disbanded the force before All Saints' Day. Come December, Suffolk and the remnants of his army were in Calais. The historian Vissière, drawing on the work of Gunn cites the coming of winter as the reason for Suffolk's withdrawal.

The historian Le Fur sees the campaign as largely a failure, that managed little other than to reconnoitre the road to Paris (describing it as a 'dress rehearsal').

=== Italian campaign of 1523 ===
Amiral Bonnivet led the French invasion of the ducato di Milan for Francis. He had with him around 30,000 men, compared to his Imperial adversaries who had mustered approximately 15,000. According to the historian Le Roux, he also boasted two princes du sang in his ranks: the duc de Vendôme and duc d'Alençon, as well as the maréchal de La Palice. Vendôme cannot have been with the army long, as he was in Paris before October was out. Outnumbered, the Imperial army, led by the condotierri commander Colonna retreated into Milan, with the French army establishing itself before the city at the end of September. Ill inclined to directly assault the well defended city, Bonnivet looked to isolate the city by controlling its surrounds. The famed French chevalier, the seigneur de Bayard failed to secure Cremona for the royal army. Around the end of 1523, the Imperial commander Colonna died, and was replaced by the viceroy of Naples de Lannoy. Lannoy looked to attack the French supply lines rather than confront the invaders directly. In early 1524 the French army under Bonnivet withdrew towards Novara, with his troops beginning to desert him. As the army was crossing the river Sesia, northwest of Novara, the Imperial force leapt on them. The French rearguard was forced back, and Bonnivet, wounded, was evacuated back to France. Command of the French army fell to Vendôme's brother Saint-Pol with the force being subject to another attack on 30 April in which Bayard was shot by an arquebus. The campaign now entered France, with the connétable de Bourbon invading Provence. The army of Bonnivet re-entered the kingdom in June 1524.

=== Return to the trust of the king ===
In November, a false rumour spread that the comte de Saint-Pol had fled to join with Bourbon in rebellion, and that the king had responded by detaining Vendôme. Vendôme for his part had returned to active command in Picardy by this month, with a new deputy governor, the Picard noble the sieur de Pont-Rémy.

In January 1524, Vendôme received the petition of Péronne to be exempted from the taille. He secured for them a five year exemption beginning in the April of that year. This was extended to a ten year exemption when the mayor visited the court in 1526, and with Vendôme's support got it expanded. His ability to represent Péronne in this matter was augmented by his nominal leadership position over the royal council that he gained in 1525.

The king held a lit de justice (a special session of the parlement under the presidency of the king) on 7 March 1524 at the parlement. Many pairs were present for the occasion, including the duc de Vendôme, the duc d'Alençon, the bishop of Langres and the bishop of Noyon. Also present were the sénéchal of Normandy, and the vicomte de Thouars. In this session, the duc de Bourbon was accused of rebellion, desertion and lèse majesté. His arrest was ordered, the sentence declared to be death and all his lands declared to be defaulted to the king.

Anxious concerning the troubles of his army in Italy, on 10 March Francis ordered a procession be conducted for the following day, so that god might grant his soldiers victory. He participated in this procession in the capital, alongside Vendôme, Alençon, the duc de Longueville, the vicomte de Thouars, the Grand Maître and all the various parlementaires.

An army under the connétable de Bourbon invaded Provence in the summer of 1524. Aix fell to his army on 8 August. He then settled in for a siege of Marseille, hoping it would serve as a bridgehead into the kingdom. With supplies poor, and a royal army being assembled near Avignon this siege did not progress well, and he was soon forced back out of Provence, with the maréchal de Montmorency on his heels.

With the driving out of the Imperials from Provence, Francis prepared to lead the fight back into Italy. At Pignerol on the border from 15 to 17 October 1524 he ratified his designation of Louise as regent of the kingdom with the rights she had enjoyed in 1515. Only a few captains who had distinguished themselves for their loyalty during the affair of Bourbon's treason would be left to protect the kingdom in the king's absence: Vendôme for Picardy and the Île de France; the comte de Guise, and comte de Vaudémont for Champagne and Burgundy; the comte de Maulévrier in Normandy; the comte de Laval in Brittany; and the seigneur de Lesparre for Languedoc and Guyenne. Even as he was putting his affairs in order before his departure, the vanguard of the French army was already menacing Milan.

Starting in September, Vendôme was entrusted with the defence of Picardy while the king was on campaign. He thus spent the next few months in Picardy, tending to the defence of the province. Vendôme split responsibility for the province with his deputy Pont-Rémy. The former based himself out of La Fère while the latter kept maritime Picardy under a watchful eye.

== Kingdom in crisis ==
=== Pavia ===
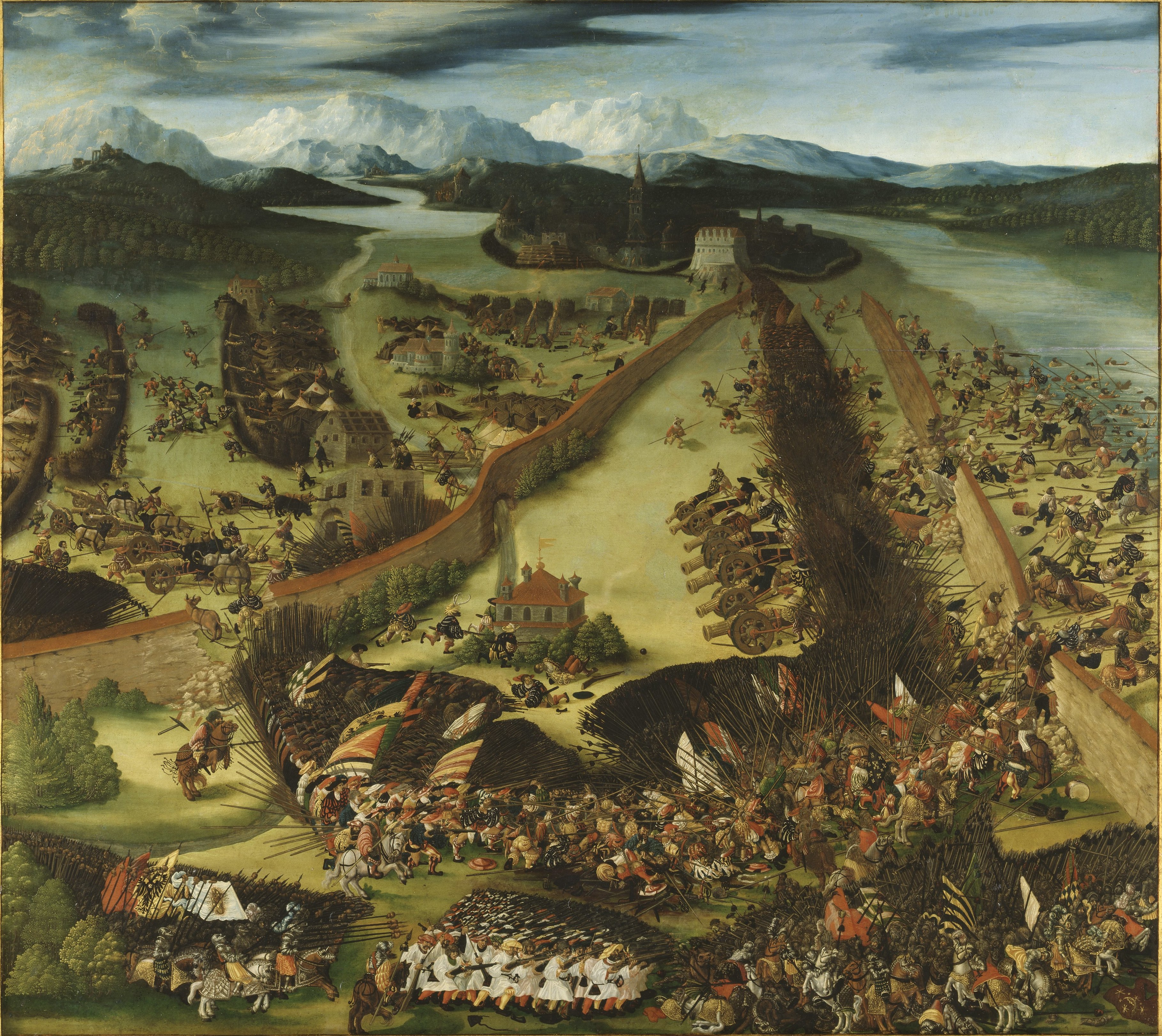
Disastrous battle of Pavia at which Francis I was captured

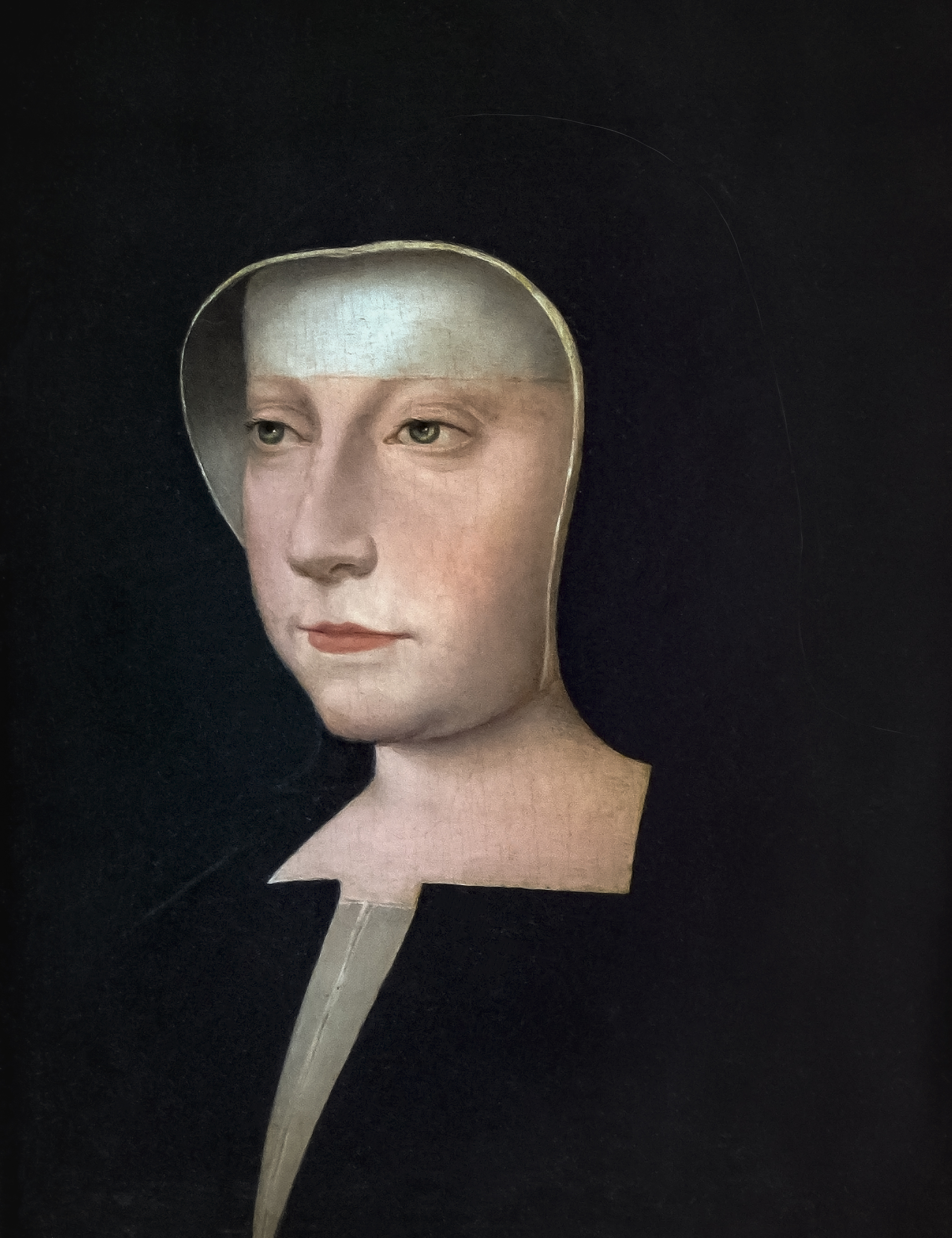
Louise, mother of Francis I and regent of the kingdom during his captivity

The duc de Vendôme complained to the regent Louise in a letter of 30 January 1525 that he had only received 18,000 livres for the pay of his infantry and light horse. He highlighted to the regent that this money would last only a month and cause desertions from garrisons.

As the Imperials abandoned Milan, Francis was able to enter the city without a fight. The king resolved to lay siege to Pavia, a well fortified town. The bombardment of the place began on 6 November. Come January 1525, the Imperial commanders were in a situation where they needed a quick victory lest they face the dissolution of their soldiers due to lack of pay. On 24 February the French were drawn into a catastrophic battle outside the city. The battle constituted the most thorough destruction of the French nobility since Agincourt over a century earlier. Of the 1,400 men-at-arms present, only 400 escaped the carnage. 1,200 Frenchmen were killed, and a further 10,000 taken as prisoners, among them the king and Vendôme's brother the comte de Saint-Pol (though the latter would escape in May).

The disastrous battle of Pavia arrived at a poor time, coinciding as it did with the death of Vendôme's deputy, Pont-Rémy in a minor battle around Hesdin in February 1525. Word reached Vendôme of what had transpired in Pavia on 7 March. The prince replaced Pont-Rémy in his captaincy of Montreuil with his brother the seigneur de Bernieulles.

=== Louise forms council ===
With Francis in captivity, Louise became responsible for the French kingdoms very survival. On 3 March she wrote to the king's various councillors, urging them to do all they were able to do for the preservation of the kingdom. She chiefly looked to her old faithfuls: the sécretaire d'État (secretary of state) Florimond Ier Robertet and chancellor Duprat but she was wise enough in the circumstances to expand her council. In the absence of the premier prince du sang, the duc d'Alençon, the duc de Vendôme was summoned to council in the city, alongside his brother the cardinal de Bourbon, the vicomte de Lautrec (governor of Guyenne), the comte de Guise (governor of Champagne) and the seigneur de Lesparre (brother of Lautrec). Jean de Selve was brought over from the parlement, and before his departure to Lyon, he urged the body to moderate its criticism of royal policy. This would be for nought. The support of Vendôme and Lautrec was particularly sought for securing the queen mothers base. According to the memoires of the du Bellay brothers, around this time a coalition tried to encourage Vendôme to usurp the position of Louise and take the regency for himself. He refused to take this step but according to the memoires of du Bellay 'dipped his foot in the water'. Recognising the threat he represented for what it was, Louise moved to sate him with the honorary position of head of the royal council. Thus, the duc de Vendôme presided over royal council.

In addition to the above grandees in the council, men of the church and robe were summoned to Lyon. The first priority of the regent and her council were to prevent an invasion of the kingdom, clamp down on any possible disorders, and fill all the offices vacated by the slaughter of the gendarmerie at Pavia.

Though he was head of the royal council, ambassadorial reports of the time suggested he remained politically insubstantial. He would have to navigate and secure the approval of a large council comprising twenty four persons, without whom he was powerless. It was Lautrec and Duprat who held the real power. Vellet gives an example of this in the arrival of the English agent Casale at the French court on 28 September 1525, in the wake of the Treaty of the More, which had been signed on 30 August. Casale informed Louise that his master, Henry VIII remained true to France even though he was receiving the entreaties of the Imperial party directed towards his favourite the cardinal Wolsey. She told Casale that she would discuss all he had said with Duprat and Lautrec.

=== Northern defence ===
On 7 March, Louise authorised the parlement of Paris to take the necessary security measures to assure itself of the capital. Collaborating with the municipal government of the city it was agreed to close most of the gates of the city, prohibit the passage of the Seine at night with goods and a new council was established, not only to manage affairs in Paris but also more distant cities in the north. There would be thirty five meetings of this council prior to July.

Vendôme passed through Paris on his way to Lyon on 10 March. He urged the city to show itself well as an example to the rest of the kingdom during this time of crisis. Around the city, bands of soldiers were engaging in pillage at this time. Along with many of the other advisors he urged deference to the parlement of Paris. He would go as far as to criticise the king's advisors and reaffirming his desire to follow the lead of the parlement while he was in the city on 10 March. As for the parlement, it followed its traditional approach during crises in the kingdom, looking to strengthen its own position.

On 26 March, absent from his governate while he was on the council in Lyon, the comte de Brienne was dispatched as Vendôme's lieutenant to deal with the problems of pillaging soldiers. He would arrive to assume his charge in April, and would be the sole authority in the province until the prince's return in 1527. This appointment came at the demand of the parlement who were insistent on the need for a competent man to be in the province during his absence. Nevertheless, the comte de Brienne was a man of his own choosing, and a (Luxembourg) kinsmen. Along with Brienne, Vendôme sent the lieutenant of his compagnie d'ordonnance the sieur de Torcy. Vendôme would remain in Lyon until such time as Francis was released from captivity.

The parlement resolved to raise 200 lances in Picardy with an intended date of muster of 8 May, and Vendôme declared that these new lances would be paid by revenue from the taille collected in April. These taille funds did not appear in Picardy. As a result of this the trésoriers had to raise the money via alternate means.

=== National defence ===
The elements of the gendarmerie that had not accompanied the king over the Alps were assembled. Alençon, who had survived the slaughter at Pavia, then returned with what was left of the army of Italy in a pitiful state. A few thousand men were allocated to the maréchal de Lautrec to hold the line at the Alps. Other sensitive areas (Burgundy, Champagne, Picardy, Lyon) were bolstered. The latter became the most defended city in the kingdom. Elsewhere on the frontier local initiative was looked to. Alençon himself would die of illness on 11 April, thereby making Vendôme the premier prince du sang. Much to the considerable fury of Vendôme, Duprat and Louise had convinced the childless prince to establish as his heir, the king's second son, the duc d'Orléans, rather than his sister, to whom Vendôme was married. Though his brother, Saint-Pol had escaped from his captivity after Pavia, he was too wounded to support Vendôme in this dispute, leaving the prince powerless to impose himself.

Vendôme requested Andrea Doria, the général du galères du roi (general of the king's galleys) and La Fayette the vice-amiral (vice-admiral) to facilitate the return of the army of the duke of Albany which was in the Papal States. This force would then reinforce the domestic French forces. Albany would thus join the band of Vendôme, Lautrec and Guise as a principal defender of the kingdom.

The poverty of the state forced efficiencies. The compagnies of French captains were reduced in size, sometimes by up to a third. Concurrently ransom money was advanced to free captives in Italy.

In May, bands of Lutheran peasants from the Empire invaded Burgundy, imagining they would find a kingdom in total chaos. They were brutally crushed by the duc de Lorraine, the comte de Guise and the comte de Vaudémont.

=== Duprat and Louise against the parlement ===
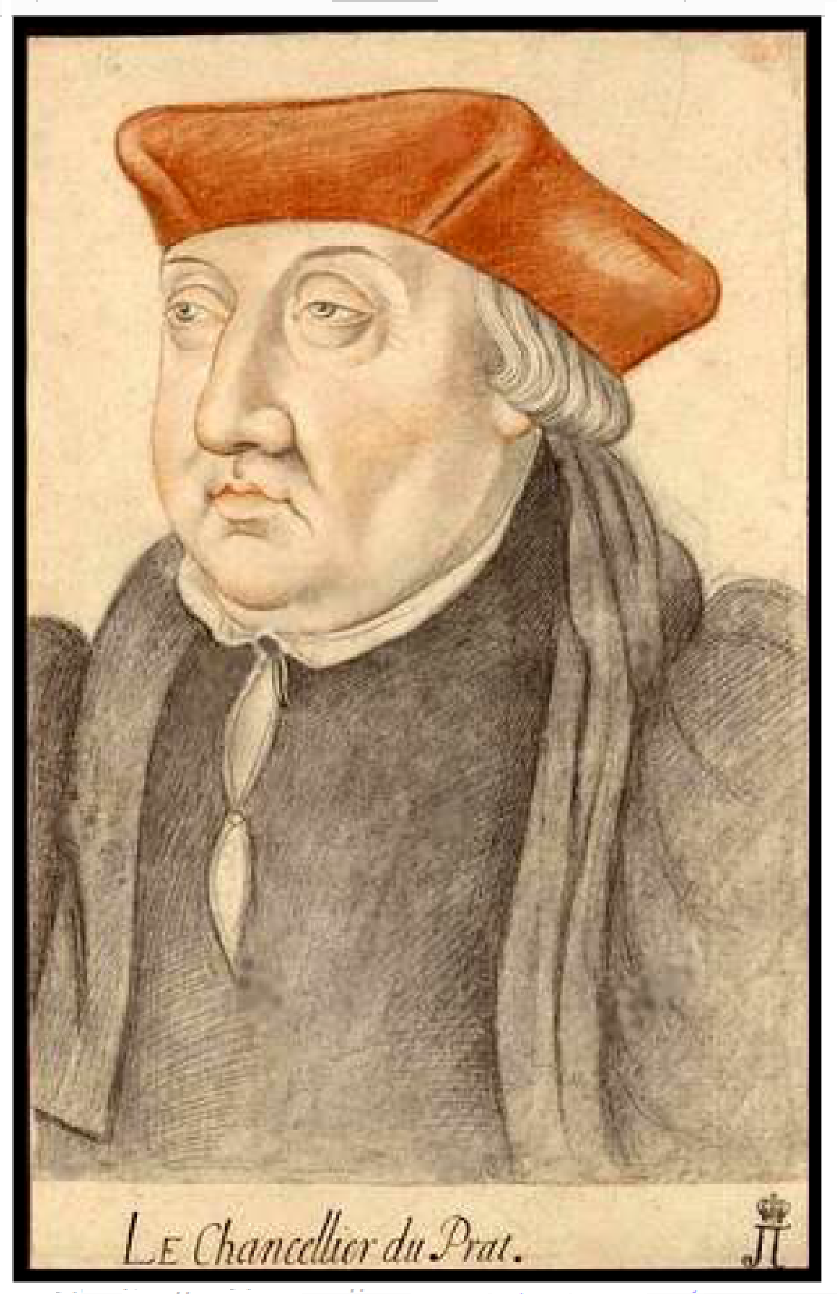
Chancellor Duprat, who earned the ire of the parlement

Vendôme's professed position of deference to the parlement worked well with that of many conseillers of the Paris parlement, who were hostile to Louise and the chancellor Duprat. The parlement was particularly hostile to a matter close to Louise's heart, the Concordat of Bologna by which the king had gained the right to designate the holders of bishoprics and abbeys, suppressing the prior system of elections. Francis' captivity had opened the door to openly oppose nominations, such as that of Duprat as archbishop of Sens and abbot of Saint-Benôit-sur-Loire in February 1525. According to the memoires of Martin du Bellay, several parlementaires sought for Vendôme to assume a position of pre-eminence over them. By this means the parlement hoped to take advantage of divisions in the state to limit royal power and accentuate their own.

In April, the parlement submitted remonstrances to the crown on a range of policies, from the tolerance of heretics, to assaults against Gallican liberties (autonomy of the French church), fiscal abuses and circumvention of the proper process of justice. These critiques were accepted in good humour by Louise, but she subsequently paid them no mind.

On 5 September 1525, the parlement declared the assumption of an abbey, by another candidate of Louise, a certain Chantereau, null and void. He was prohibited from collecting the income of the abbey. This was to overturn the judgement of the Grand Conseil which had decided in Chantereau's favour in assuming the charge. That same day, the parlementaires decided to write to Vendôme, Saint-Pol, the cardinal de Bourbon and vicomte de Lautrec hoping that these men were hostile to Duprat and the enterprises of the Grand Conseil (over which Duprat was judge). The letters to these men would be issued on 12 September. Duprat's 'machinations' were put in opposition to the interests of Francis, Louise, and justice. In addition to this appeal the parlement summoned a meeting of the pairs de France for 12 November so that they discuss matters as related to the king, the authority of the parlement and justice. The true intention of this proposed meeting would be to attack Duprat. However, the parlement were hesitant to follow through with this threat, and postponed the summons until they had received a response from Louise's council.

Though stalling the summoning of the pairs, the parlement requested Vendôme and the cardinal de Bourbon present their remonstrances to Louise. Both men were invited to sit in the parlement. On 12 September, the parlement wrote to Louise complaining that the independence of justice was threatened by enterprises of 'certain individuals' in the name of the Grand Conseil (i.e. Duprat). Louise remained firm in her faith in Duprat, and was wary of Vendôme who the body was pushing forward.

The appeals of the parlement to the various members of the court (among them Vendôme) fell on deaf ears. Louise was increasingly confident in her position after reaching accord with England. She kept the three parlementaires who had come to meet with her waiting for six weeks then berated them for their own abuses of justice. She further accused them of trying to call an Estates General on their own authority. On 14 November, one of the parlementaires announced to the parlement in Paris that the government was liable to soon arrest some of its members. The parlement therefore opted to suspend its action against the disputed sees in return for the Grand Conseil likewise suspending its actions. Their wish to have Duprat before them was explained away as intended to produce 'brotherly and good discussions'. Louise was satisfied in this, knowing Francis upon his return would subdue the body.

=== Vendôme against Lautrec ===
According to a certain account, Louise made out that she wanted to establish the vicomte de Lautrec as lieutenant-général over Vendôme, hoping by this means to make clear to Vendôme what he had to lose if he joined the parlementaires party of opposition. Vendôme and Lautrec had been in a rivalry for pre-eminence in the kingdom. While Vendôme had greater legitimacy, he was poorer in military experience than Lautrec, allowing the latter to better pose as the kingdoms saviour at a time when the borders were vulnerable. Thus, Louise could set up Lautrec in opposition to him. According to an English informant, there was tension between the two men during May. During June, Vendôme and Lautrec entered a dispute with one another, during their argument Louise and Duprat took the side of Lautrec, while Vendôme enjoyed the support of Robertet. Champollion-Figeac dates the document concerning the plan to appoint Lautrec lieutenant-général in Vendôme's stead to around October 1525, Michon disputes this however, arguing that from what it says about Saint-Pol elsewhere that it can be placed in May or June.

Through her manoeuvrers, Louise was able to quickly defuse the opposition alliance of the princes du sang and parlementaires.

The parlement for its part had been less interested in stoking the fires of hatred between Vendôme and Lautrec than in isolating and attack Duprat.

=== Accord with England ===
Negotiations for peace with England took place in the summer of 1525. Finally, on 30 August, at the English palace of The More, a treaty was agreed. By its terms, hostilities between England and France would cease. A defensive league was to be established including the participation of England, France, Hungary, Navarre, Scotland, the Papacy, the duc de Lorraine and others. Between England and France there would be free movement of peoples and goods. Henry VIII would release his French hostages that were held as security for the French payment of Tournai (which had been sold to the French in 1518). The English king would renounce all his rights in France, and assist in the securing of Francis' release for 'reasonable terms'. The French for their part, would give the English 2,000,000 écus in the form of 100,000 écus annuities paid every year in two instalments, May and November. The pensions the French crown had provided to English princes would be restored. In the absence of Francis, to ensure the French abiding by this treaty, Louise and, the king's eldest son the Duke of Brittany would be obliged to appear before an ecclesiastical tribunal to request excommunication should they fail to uphold the terms. The French debt to the English was pledged against eight bonnes villes of France, and nine nobles (among whom were the maréchal de Montmorency, the vicomte de Lautrec, the seigneur de Brienne, the duc de Longueville and the duc de Vendôme and his two brothers). Francis would have to validate the peace within three months, by letter if still in Imperial captivity.

The peace was published in France on 22 September and on 27 September a text for the subjects of the French crown was distributed. It failed to mention the sums the government had paid to ensure tranquillity on the borders. Vendôme and the other nobles kept quiet about the obligations the peace imposed on them. The parlement would register the peace on 20 October, to be followed by the reticent city of Paris a few weeks later.

=== Towards the release of Francis ===
When the regent Louise learned of the transfer of her son from Italy to Spain, the chancellor Duprat and Vendôme designated the parlementaire de Selve to begin to undertake negotiations with the Imperial party.

In October, Vendôme was appraised of the ill health of the king, who was still in captivity in Madrid. There were some fears that the king would die from his illness.

As negotiations were undertaken for peace with the Holy Roman Emperor, Francis' conditional release was contingent on the provision of hostages to the Imperial camp. Two possible sets of hostages were proposed. The one, the king's two eldest sons (the Duke of Brittany and the Duke of Orléans) or alternatively, just the eldest son, but combined with twelve great nobles of the kingdom (including Vendôme, his brother the comte de Saint-Pol, the vicomte de Lautrec, the duke of Albany and the maréchal de Montmorency). In effect these represented all the potential leaders of a French army. The choice was therefore easy for the regency government, and it was chosen to send the two eldest sons of the king into captivity. The crown's propagandists made it clear that the surrendering of the king's two eldest sons was a demand the monarchy could not escape. On 28 January 1526, Montmorency brought the treaty of Madrid to Lyon.

One term of the treaty of Madrid was that Vendôme's cousin, the connétable de Bourbon, would be restored to his lands and dignities. Francis would put as much stock in obeying this condition of the treaty as he would all the other terms.

On 17 February the vicomte de Lautrec set off with the two royal princes destined to be hostages in Spain. This procession slowly made its way to Bayonne, where it arrived on 13 March. The exchange for the king was set for 17 March on a pontoon in the middle of the Bidasoa river between Hendaye and Hondarribia. On that day, at 7 in the morning, Francis embarked on a barge at one bank and his children did likewise on the other. The two parties met on the pontoon in the middle and had a brief and silent meeting transpired in which they kissed one another. Francis then embarked on the children's barge and made his way into France. He was greeted by celebratory cries, and quickly rode for Bayonne.

== Francis' second reign ==
=== Distribution of favour ===
One of Francis' first acts was to distribute the charges once held by the dead of Pavia. The seigneur de Brion was made amiral de Chabot and lieutenant-général of Burgundy, the former in lieu of Bonnivet and the latter in lieu of the vicomte de Thouars. Montmorency was made Grand Maître in lieu of the bâtard de Savoie (the bastard of Savoie) and the government of Languedoc in lieu of the connétable de Bourbon. The Count of Maulévrier was rewarded for his role in unfurling the conspiracy of the duc de Bourbon with the office of governor of Normandy, in lieu of the duc d'Alençon. Vendôme's brother, the Count de Saint-Pol was granted the government of Dauphiné, replacing the seigneur de La Palice in the charge. Vendôme himself remained a pillar of the royal council, alongside Duprat and the président Jean de Selve, however the promotion of many of the survivors of Pavia indicated Francis' need to attach to himself young men whose fortune and career depended entirely on him .

In March, Vendôme ceased to bear the charge of governor of the Île de France, resigning it in favour of the marchese di Saluzzo (marquis of Saluzzo).

In April 1526, the Venetian diplomat Andrea Rosso met with the new Grand Maître Montmorency in Bordeaux with view to establishing an anti-Imperial league. On 23 May 1526 Vendôme, Saint-Pol, Montmorency, the chancellor Duprat, the secrétaire Robertet and the archbishop of Bordeaux subscribed to this League of Cognac.

A procession with the bodies of the French queen Claude and her young daughter Louise were held in October 1526, having been delayed due to the circumstances of the war. They were taken from Blois to Paris, where their funeral service would be held on 5 November. The comte de Saint-Pol, Vendôme and his wife were among the mourners. Also present was the king's mother Louise and his sister Marguerite.

=== Unfinished business ===
On 29 November 1526, Francis summoned several parlementaires before the grand conseil so that they might explain the opposition their body had offered to Duprat the previous year during the regency government over the bishopric of Sens and abbey of Saint-Benoît-sur-Loire. A week later Francis met with the parlementaires again accompanied by the king of Navarre, the duc de Vendôme, the comte de Saint-Pol, the maréchal de Montmorency, the amiral de Chabot, the duc de Longueville, the duke of Albany and the archbishop of Bourges. They explained their alleged disobedience to the regency government and the council which Vendôme had nominally led. A few days after the meeting they were suspended from their duties.

In 1527, with the death of the connétable de Bourbon, the Bourbon-Vendôme became the most senior branch of the Bourbon family. Due to the confiscations of the duc de Bourbon's lands, this elevation came without receipt of the older branches lands.

On 24 July 1527, the king held a lit de justice in the parlement of Paris. He hoped to definitively settle the conflict of the regency period between Duprat/Louise and the parlement. The king took his place in his throne under the canopy, surrounded by the king of Navarre, the duc de Vendôme, the comte de Saint-Pol, the cardinal de Bourbon, the Grand Maître Montmorency, the seigneur d'Aubigny, and all the chevaliers de l'Ordre de Saint-Michel (knights of the order of Saint-Michel). Several bishops and the great officers of state were also represented. Duprat enquired of the parlementaires, as was tradition, if any of them had any remonstrances they wished the king to hear. The premier président (first president) Guillart spoke on behalf of the body. He urged the king to combat heresy, suppress venal office and to cease evoking affairs to the attentions of his council. His speech concluded by stating that while he did not want to challenge the absolute authority that the king enjoyed, it was wise to only use such absolute authority where it was for good and worthy causes. Having listened to Guillart's extensive remonstrance, Francis did not issue a reply but rather rose from his seat and locked himself in an adjoining room with his council (including Vendôme, Saint-Pol, the king of Navarre, and the various great officers of state). The king or his councillors there prepared their reply. In the afternoon this response was read before the parlement. The body was chided for trying to involve itself in affairs of state. It was denied that the parlement enjoyed any cognisance over the Concordat with the Papacy. Likewise they had no cognisance over Duprat, who, as chancellor, was responsible to the king. As such, all they had done injurious to him was null and void, and all writings against him were to be destroyed. All the decisions made by Louise during her regency were affirmed. It was further affirmed she would enjoy the same powers in any future absences of the king. The king stated that he would not abide modifications of his ordonnances, or chastisements, and that the responsibility of the parlement as regarded royal edicts was simply to proffer their advice. Vellet describes these lit de justice as a 'humiliation inflicted upon the parlement' something which well served the chancellor Duprat.

On 26 July the king held a new lit de justice before the parlement. The indictment of the recently deceased duc de Bourbon was read again and witnesses heard in the case. The next day, the connétable was declared guilty with his memory to be damned, coat of arms to be struck, lands he held at the king's pleasure restored to the crown and the rest he held privately confiscated. Finally the declaration of the king's council from 24 July was registered.

The July transfer of the property of the late duc de Bourbon to the queen mother Louise aroused the protestations of the duc de Vendôme, and the princesse de La Roche-sur-Yon. Though Louise was not granted Auvergne, she would receive the Bourbonnais, Beaujolais, La Marche, Forez, Châtellerault, and Clermont. The legal case for the territories was argued at length, and after the death of Louise in 1531 the lands fell to the king. The king was conscious of the service the Bourbon-Vendôme had rendered to him. Nevertheless, the correspondence of the cardinal du Bellay in 1530-1531 as concerned the properties of the princesse de La Roche-sur-Yon indicate those around the king still held him in suspicion. In 1538, shortly after Vendôme's death, a first compromise was reached with the princesse de La Roche-sur-Yon by which she received the comté de Montpensier, the Forez and the dauphiné d'Auvergne. In return the Vendôme and La Roche-sur-Yon would renounce their claims to the rest of the inheritance. A final settlement would not be arrived at until the reign of Charles IX, long after the duc de Vendôme's death.

=== Friendship with England ===
While war was proceeding in the south, the king met with the cardinal Wolsey outside Amiens on 4 August 1527. Vendôme was among those nobles who joined with the king for the ostentatious occasion. The two parties entered the city to cries of joy. It would be Vendôme and the cardinal de Bourbon who fetched Wolsey from his apartments for his meeting with the ladies. After his meeting, it was they who returned him to them. The three Bourbon brothers would be around the king for his meeting with Wolsey the next day. The treaty of More that was established in 1526 was reaffirmed and was to be sealed by a marriage between the king's son the duc d'Orléans and the English princess Mary. The collaborative desire of the two crowns to see Orléans and Brittany freed from Imperial captivity was also stated. If ransom was refused for their liberty, the two monarchs affirmed their willingness to fight against the Emperor for the liberty of the princes. Both men also committed to the liberation of the Pope, something the French were already campaigning to achieve. Further terms followed concerning Milan and the English king Henry's marital situation. The new accord between the two crowns was celebrated on 20 August at Amiens Cathedral.

In November 1527 the baron de Montmorency returned from England. He assumed a dual responsibility to prepare the defences of the kingdom and to keep an eye on the progress of the royal armies in Italy. To the former's end, he centralised receipts of reports on the kingdom's border fortifications, receiving letters from the various frontier governors (Vendôme - Picardy, Guise - Champagne, du Biez - Boulogne, Annebault - Burgundy Clermont - Languedoc and Saint-Bonnet - Bayonne). Vendôme's brother, Saint-Pol was one of the men who reported to Montmorency on the campaign in Italy, until his capture in 1529. Montmorency's presence on the royal council in these years (of the late 1520s) reinforced the importance of many of these commanders (Vendôme, Saint-Pol, Chabot, Maulévrier and Genouillac).

=== Paying a ransom ===
By the terms of Francis' alliance with the English king, he had violated the terms of the Treaty of Madrid with the Emperor. In his alliance with Henry, it was declared that he would not grant any of his land to his former jailer. There was therefore the possibility of being accused of perjury. Francis wanted to have his violations endorsed before a representative assembly. To this end, on 16 December 1527, a meeting of 200 delegates was held: comprising nobles, members of the clergy and parlements and representatives of the city of Paris. It was declared that Francis had always been a lover of peace, and had never aspired to war. He had only assumed arms to defend himself aggressors who threatened not only his kingdom but also his life. In particular, there was the criminal duc de Bourbon, who had compelled a pursuit into Italy. As for the treaty of Madrid, he lied that he had no role in its construction, and thus made it clear he did not feel bound by its terms. He also summarised the League of Cognac, devised he alleged to force the Emperor to renounce his pretensions to Burgundy, and the offers made by himself and Henry VIII for the liberty of the princes. English and French delegates were on route to Spain, and the Emperor's response was anticipated. Whether their terms were accepted and there was peace with the Empire, or rejected, with war, 2,000,000 écus was required to either pay the ransom of the princes or finance the army. He then opened the floor to the delegates, asking them about the validity of the treaty of Madrid, whether he should return to Imperial captivity to pay off his debts and the wisdom of the ransom.

On 20 December, the delegates declared the treaty of Madrid to be null and void. By the invalidity of this treaty, there was no cause for Francis to return to captivity, and he lacked any obligations to the Emperor. The payment of the ransom was viewed as the path forward. For the clergy, the cardinal de Bourbon offered 1,300,000 livres to the king, in return for which the crown would see Lutheranism suppressed, defend Gallican liberties (the autonomy of the French church from that of Rome) and aid the Pope. Vendôme who served as the representative for the nobility of the assembly declared the classes willingness to lay down their lives and property for Francis. Président de Selve affirmed a similar willingness from the parlementaires. Finally the prévôt (provost) de Paris, on behalf of the people of the city, assured they would contribute to the royal ransom.

By this means, from both his allies and subjects, Francis had been endorsed to violate the treaty of Madrid. Despite the promises of Vendôme during this meeting, the actual provision of money by the nobility would prove less forthcoming. Francis would explain before a gathering of nobles in the Île de France that by providing him funds their liberties could be well preserved. He denied the rumour that he intended to make them liable to pay the taille (direct land tax), simply asking them for monetary gifts as proof of their affection. They conceded to provide 10% of their revenues. In the Boulonnais the initial offers of the nobility were of such stinginess that Montmorency refused to transmit it to the king.

From 1528, the sieur de La Rochepot served as the lieutenant-général of Picardy in the absence of the duc de Vendôme from his province.

While mobilisation was underway in the spring of 1528, Vendôme opined that the mortespaies (permanent garrison soldiers) offered little more in the way of reliability than did his other soldiers. They were without pay and there were few left in the cities. He made note of this in a latter to Francis in February. Potter notes that in the 1530s pay became more reliable for these mortespaies. The duc raised 6,000 aventuriers (name given to the new bands of French infantry), with the speed he was able to do so puzzling the historian.

Vendôme and Montmorency recommended the services of the seigneur de Vervins to the future maréchal du Biez in 1528. Du Biez established Vervins as his lieutenant upon their recommendation, though Vervins would disgrace himself in the failed defence of Boulogne in 1544.

=== Protestant scandal ===
A scandal occurred in Paris on 1 June 1528, when a statue of the Virgin Mary was attacked. Her head and that of Jesus were decapitated, and Mary's body slashed at several times with a dagger. The heads of the figures, which had been cast into the mud were brought to the lieutenant-criminel of Paris. He offered a reward of 50 livres for whoever would find the criminal who had profaned the statues. With no result, the bounty was doubled. Word began to spread, and even reached the ears of the king. Offended (indeed, supposedly tearful when he learned of it), he was thus present for a procession on the day of the Feast of Corpus Christi. He had purchased a new statue, of silver for the sum of 248 livres, and wished to personally place it in the niche. At the site of the sacrilege, an altar for mass had been raised, covered by a canvas held up by Vendôme, Navarre, Longueville and the duca di Ferrara. Francis made his devotions to Mary and Jesus beneath this canvas before returning to the hôtel des Tournelles.

On 29 July 1528, Vendôme wrote to Montmorency with disapproval concerning the pillage undertaken by the (French) soldiery in Picardy for want of pay.

=== Return of the princes ===
In the first days of July 1530, the successful ransoming of the royal children was accomplished, and they re-entered the kingdom of France after four years of exile. Francis was in Bordeaux, and received the news from Montpezat on 2 July. The royal propaganda recounted that Francis, alone in his room, was overwhelmed with his emotions but in a proper Christian fashion fell to his knees so that he might pray to god for all the good fortunes he had afforded the king in his years. Tears streamed down his face and for a long term no words came to him. Then reason reasserted itself and he thanked god not only for placing him on the throne but also reuniting him with his children. This private prayer was quickly published. He was soon joined in the room by the great princes: Navarre, Vendôme, the cardinal de Lorraine, the duc de Guise and the comte de Saint-Pol (now free from his captivity). Having received the news, they too all began to pray and weep in joy. The broader populace of Bordeaux was invited to down their tools and celebrate the joyous news. A few days later, on 6 July, the king was reunited with his eldest two sons.

On 10 July, the king, his new queen Éléonore, and the royal children made an entrance into Bordeaux by richly decorated boats. There was a grand host of boats carrying the various nobles of the court. Artillery was fired in Bordeaux to celebrate their arrival. With Éléonore in a litter and the royal sons on horseback, the party was accompanied into the city itself by Vendôme, Saint-Pol, the duc de Nemours, the comte de Nevers and the duc de Guise. The city they entered was hung with tapestries, and several allegorical displays on scaffolds.

The prince's lieutenant in Picardy, the comte de Brienne, died at the end of 1530. Francis appointed a new man to serve as Vendôme's deputy on 1 May 1531 in the character of the sieur de La Rochepot (brother of the Grand Maître Montmorency). This appointment represented part of a court battle between Montmorency and his enemy the amiral de Chabot. Vendôme did not find La Rochepot's appointment disagreeable.

In April 1531 there were troubles with food prices in Picardy, meaning that grain was selling at a high price. The royal agent La Hargerie reported on the discontent this was causing, and Vendôme responded by urging him to suppress any uprising and make examples out of the leaders.

Vendôme was at the château de Fontainebleau for royal council around July 1531.

The duc de Vendôme and his brother Saint-Pol were again with the king for a lit de justice conducted on 4 August 1533 at the parlement of Toulouse. Many of the other great seigneurs of the kingdom were also present for the occasion, including the king of Navarre, the comte de Nevers and the chancellor.

=== Affair of the Placards ===
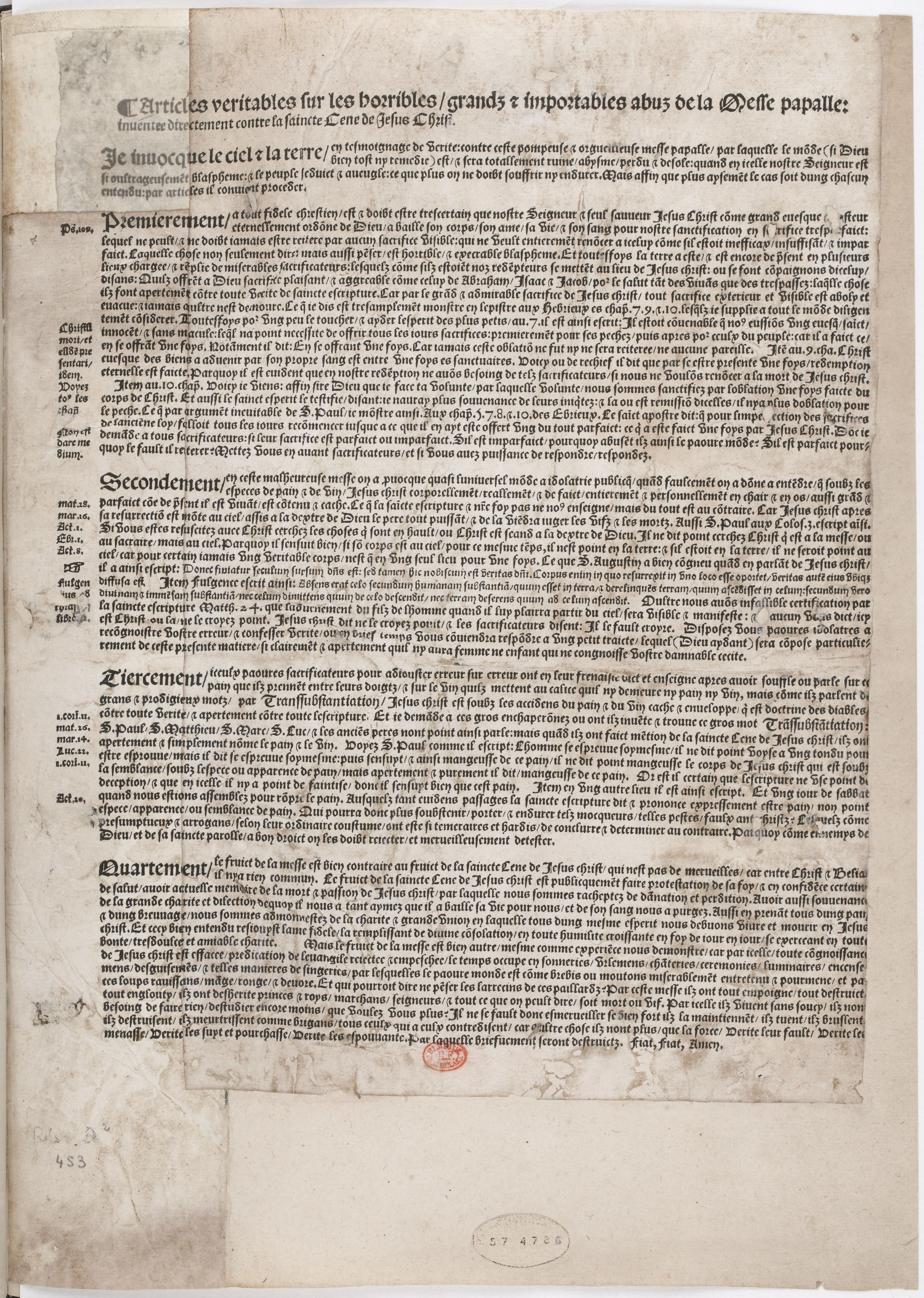
Example of the Protestant placards that scandalised public opinion

On the night of 17 October 1534, a great scandal occurred that has become known to posterity as the Affair of the Placards. Across many cities along the Loire including Paris and Lyon, and also the king's bedroom at Amboise, placards were hung. These placards ridiculed the Catholic faith, and this constituted an explosive event. Rumours swirled that Catholics were to be massacred, and sentences and burnings were quickly imposed on various suspects of raising the placards. In a broader response, a greater legal rigor against Protestantism was imposed. Francis returned to the capital and indicated his approval of the current measures taken. A new printing scandal occurred shortly after his arrival in the capital, and the king ordered the banning of all printing until further notice. Francis resolved to undertake a grand procession in the capital, which transpired on 17 January 1535. The procession featured the mendicant orders, the queen Éléonore dressed in black, then the king's daughters guarded by a crowd of gentleman and then the men of the various churches of the capital carrying the shrines and relics of the saints of the capital and the Swiss-guard. Cardinals, archbishops, and bishops carried relics of the passion, and the head of Louis IX. Cardinal du Bellay, the bishop of Paris, brought forth the holy sacrament under a canopy carried by Vendôme and the three sons of the king (i.e. the next four men in the line of succession). The king himself walked without a hat on his head, behind this canopy, along with the cardinal de Lorraine. Then followed many great nobles all with a lit candle in their hand. Finally came the parlementaires and the bourgeois of the capital.

After a mass and a dinner the king delivered a speech in which he announced his commitment to eradicating heresy. So firm was his belief in doing so that even if it infected his children, it would not stay his hand from killing them. Six Lutherans were burned at the stake in front of Notre-Dame, while the king, his family and his court were feasting. Soon thereafter it was declared that those who harboured heretics were as guilty as the heretics themselves.

=== Crisis on the border ===
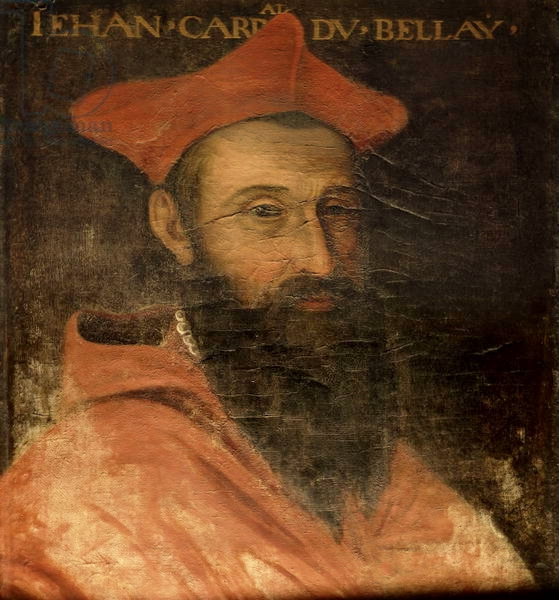
Cardinal du Bellay who supported Vendôme in combatting the crisis of the kingdom in 1536

In June 1536, Vendôme was permitted to use royal funds to raise 2,000 foot soldiers. To this end 18,000 livres was put at the disposal of the trésorier de l'extraordinaire. The cardinal du Bellay was established as the governor of the Île de France and Paris in July 1536. There was threat of invasion at this time and thus Paris had been fortified, and funds raised to support the soldiery in Picardy.

Auxi-le-Château, a domain of the Luxembourg-Fiennes family which lay partly within France was a subject to confiscations at time of war. Thus, in 1536 it was seized by the French and held by the duc de Vendôme.

Vendôme had secured a loan from Paris to the sum of 40,000 livres, however he would only be sent 20,000 livres. With Vendôme and La Rochepot frustratedly demanding the rest of their money, the king authorised the cardinal du Bellay to raise new loans on Paris. Part of the sum du Bellay raised would go towards Paris fortifications, much to Vendôme's vexation. In late July he opined that if his army was forced to break up for lack of funds, all the Parisian fortifications would be of no use anyway. Du Bellay retorted to La Rochepot that he was not a miracle worker, and that Vendôme's attitude was making his job more challenging.

As the Imperial army surged into Provence in July 1536, a parallel invasion was undertaken by the graaf van Nassau into Picardy. Nassau invaded on 12 August. He laid siege to Péronne that same day. The defence of Picardy was entrusted to Vendôme, the duc de Guise and the cardinal du Bellay. Vendôme put little stock in the reliability of the légionnaires (legionaries - a new form of volunteer infantry raised on a permanent basis, unlike aventuriers who were only paid in campaign, that had been established by Francis in 1534) under his authority, seeing them as liable to quickly mutiny if they were not paid on time. Vendôme darkly threatened to have them cut to pieces if they would refuse to obey his orders. Thus, Vendôme found himself in an acrimonious dispute with the cardinal du Bellay who he alleged had exerted himself insufficiently in the service of providing his soldiers money. Du Bellay responded to the duc charging him with putting less faith in him than he should. Potter argues that du Bellay indeed was striving to support Vendôme as he could. During August his demands for money became more panicked and he added extra demands onto his original requests. For example on 6 August he supplemented his original pay demand of 20,000 livres with a further 35,000 livres so that he might support his infantry for two weeks. This tactic yielded fruit, as on 8 August his agents were granted an extra 20,000 livres. The cardinal was balancing the need to financially support Vendôme with the cost of raising the defences of the capital. Nevertheless, according to Knecht he succeeded in raising a new loan of 140,000 livres and getting Parisian support to pay for 6,000 soldiers in Picardy. Potter states that he provided 13,000 livres from the Louvre war chest in mid-August, 30,000 livres from a loan of 60,000 he had raised, with the other 30,000 kept in reserve for his use, and a further 50,000 livres was reallocated to him that had been intended for royal building works. These funds arrived with Vendôme just in time as with the end of August approaching he was at risk of losing many of his men that had not been paid in a month.

Vendôme held the 6,000 soldiers du Bellay had raised in low esteem, describing them as 'scoundrels' who were liable to mutiny. In addition to the paucity of money, much of the gendarmerie was occupied dealing with the southern invasion. Despite these difficulties, Vendôme's men were more reliable than he had anticipated. Jean d'Estourmel, a maître d'hôtel to Vendôme, among other charges, helped bolster the resolve of Péronne by bringing his family and property into the besieged town. He also had the harvest of his estates brought in to nourish the garrison. Nassau could not succeed in his efforts against Péronne and was compelled to retire to Flanders.

Though the crisis had passed at Péronne before his 6,000 soldiers could be mustered, the prince was still short of funds for their wages, and bitterly suspected Paris of delaying the provision of money for them (something that they were only obligated to do as Vendôme had manufactured a promise by them to do so and threatened to inform Francis if they did not). The soldiers would prove feisty and besieged du Bellay in his residence. Three of the ringleaders in this mutiny would later be hanged.

Vendôme did not hesitate during the war of 1536-1538 to impose a levy of 600 livres on the élection of Compiègne, even though it was not part of his governate of Picardy.

In November 1536, Vendôme's deputy in Picardy, La Rochepot, fell from a gallery and injured himself. He was thus temporarily replaced as lieutenant by the seigneur d'Humières.

=== Final campaign ===
In March 1537 another campaign was transpiring in his province of Picardy. Though Vendôme had begun it in good health he suddenly came over with an illness around 17 March. The king spent some time with the prince in Amiens. On 25 March 1537, Vendôme died. His death was just one of many prominent deaths around this time that plagued upon the king (along with Francis' eldest son, his daughter the queen of Scotland, and his intimate companion the maréchal de Fleuranges). Vendôme's death was much mourned.

In his position as governor of Picardy he was succeeded on a temporary basis by his former deputy the sieur de La Rochepot, who held the charge for a year before Vendôme's eldest son assumed the position in February 1538.

In 1538 his body was transferred to Vendôme where he would be buried in the collegiate church of Saint-George.

The tomb of Vendôme and his wife in the city of Vendôme would be ransacked by Protestants in 1562, with the bones of the couple scattered. It is possible that this desecration occurred with the assent of Vendôme's daughter-in-law, Jeanne d'Albret, the queen of Navarre.

=== Legacy ===
The historian Michon sees Vendôme as fundamentally uninterested in translating his position as head of the Bourbon-Vendôme family into that of a key royal advisor or favourite. He even finds that in 1525 when the king was a prisoner, and Vendôme was the head of the royal council that he had little desire to impose himself politically. He argues that Vendôme lacked a policy or a faction. For Michon, Vendôme never enjoyed royal favour, and even his favoured brother Saint-Pol was confined to a secondary position. The political strength of the Bourbon-Vendôme, such as it was, was in their number, with three brothers comparing against the two Lorraine brothers, and the other royal favourites (like Montmorency, Annebaut and Chabot) who if they did have brothers, saw them confined to secondary roles.

== Notes ==
^α Potter describes Humières as being the godson of Enghien rather than the godfather, but this is unlikely given Enghien was 9 in 1528.
^β Kalas incorrectly records the date as 1522. The historians Le Fur and Crouzet confirm the correct date of 28 April 1521.

== Sources ==
- Babelon, Jean-Pierre (2009). Henri IV. Fayard.
- Boltanski, Ariane (2006). Les ducs de Nevers et l'État royal: genèse d'un compromis (ca 1550 - ca 1600). Librairie Droz.
- Bourquin, Laurent (2013). "Les Du Bellay avant Du Bellay". In Michon, Cédric; Petris, Loris (eds.). Le Cardinal Jean du Bellay: Diplomatie et Culture dans l'Europe de la Renaissance. Presses Universitaires de Rennes; Presses Universitaires François-Rabelais.
- Cooper, Richard (2013). "Poésies Inédites de Jean Du Bellay". In Michon, Cédric; Petris, Loris (eds.). Le Cardinal Jean du Bellay: Diplomatie et Culture dans l'Europe de la Renaissance. Presses Universitaires de Rennes; Presses Universitaires François-Rabelais.
- Crouzet, Denis (2003). Charles de Bourbon: Connétable de France. Fayard.
- Durot, Éric (2012). François de Lorraine, duc de Guise entre Dieu et le Roi. Classiques Garnier. ISBN 9782812406102.
- Guinand, Julien (2020). La Guerre du Roi aux Portes de l'Italie: 1515-1559. Presses Universitaires de Rennes.
- Hamon, Philippe (1999). «Messieurs des Finances»: Les Grands Officiers de Finance dans la France de la Renaissance. Comité pour l'Histoire Économique et Financière de la France.
- Hamon, Philippe (2011). "Charles de Bourbon, connétable de France (1490-1527)". In Michon, Cédric (ed.). Les Conseillers de François Ier. Presses Universitaires de Rennes.
- Harding, Robert (1978). Anatomy of a Power Elite: the Provincial Governors in Early Modern France. Yale University Press.
- Jacquart, Jean (1994). François Ier. Fayard.
- Kalas, Robert (2011). "Jean de Selve (1475-1529)". In Michon, Cédric (ed.). Les Conseillers de François Ier. Presses Universitaires de Rennes.
- Knecht, Robert (1994). Renaissance Warrior and Patron: The Reign of Francis I. Cambridge University Press.
- Knecht, Robert (1996). The Rise and Fall of Renaissance France. Fontana Press.
- Knecht, Robert (2008). The French Renaissance Court. Yale University Press.
- Knecht, Robert (2011). "Jacques II de Chabannes, seigneur de La Palisse ou La Palice (v. 1470-1525)". In Michon, Cédric (ed.). Les Conseillers de François Ier. Presses Universitaires de Rennes.
- Knecht, Robert (2011b). "Louise de Savoie (1476-1531)". In Michon, Cédric (ed.). Les Conseillers de François Ier. Presses Universitaires de Rennes.
- Knecht, Robert (2011c). "Philippe Chabot de Brion (v. 1492-1543)". In Michon, Cédric (ed.). Les Conseillers de François Ier. Presses Universitaires de Rennes.
- Le Fur, Didier (2010). Louis XII: Un Autre César. Perrin.
- Le Fur, Didier (2018). François Ier. Perrin.
- Le Roux, Nicolas (2015). Le Crépuscule de la Chevalerie: Noblesse et Guerre au Siècle de la Renaissance. Champ Vallon.
- Michon, Cédric (2011). "Conseils et Conseillers sous François Ier". In Michon, Cédric (ed.). Les Conseillers de François Ier. Presses Universitaires de Rennes.
- Michon, Cédric (2011b). "Introduction: Le Conseil de François Ier (1515-1531)". In Michon, Cédric (ed.). Les Conseillers de François Ier. Presses Universitaires de Rennes.
- Michon, Cédric (2011c). "Charles, duc d'Alençon (1489-1525)". In Michon, Cédric (ed.). Les Conseillers de François Ier. Presses Universitaires de Rennes.
- Michon, Cédric (2011d). "Odet de Foix, vicomte de Lautrec (v. 1483-1528)". In Michon, Cédric (ed.). Les Conseillers de François Ier. Presses Universitaires de Rennes.
- Michon, Cédric (2011e). "Gabriel de Gramont (1486-1534)". In Michon, Cédric (ed.). Les Conseillers de François Ier. Presses Universitaires de Rennes.
- Michon, Cédric (2011f). "Les Frères de Bourbon-Vendôme: Charles, duc de Bourbon-Vendôme (1489-1537); François, comte de Saint-Pol (1491-1545); Louis cardinal de Bourbon (1493-1557)". In Michon, Cédric (ed.). Les Conseillers de François Ier. Presses Universitaires de Rennes.
- Michon, Cédric; Rentet, Thierry (2011). "Annexe I: Présences annuelles au Conseil (1515-1547)". In Michon, Cédric (ed.). Les Conseillers de François Ier. Presses Universitaires de Rennes.
- Michon, Cédric (2018). François Ier: Un Roi Entre Deux Mondes. Belin.
- Potter, David (1992). "The Luxembourg Inheritance: The House of Bourbon and its lands in Northern France during the Sixteenth Century". French History. 6 (1).
- Potter, David (1993). War and Government in the French Provinces: Picardy 1470-1560. Cambridge University Press.
- Potter, David (1995). A History of France 1460-1560: The Emergence of a Nation State. Macmillan.
- Potter, David (2013). "Jean Du Bellay et l'Angleterre 1527-1550". In Michon, Cédric; Petris, Loris (eds.). Le Cardinal Jean du Bellay: Diplomatie et Culture dans l'Europe de la Renaissance. Presses Universitaires de Rennes; Presses Universitaires François-Rabelais.
- Quilliet, Bernard (1998). La France du Beau XVIe Siècle. Fayard.
- Rentet, Thierry (2011). Anne de Montmorency: Grand Maître de François Ier. Presses Universitaires de Rennes.
- Rentet, Thierry (2011b). "Anne de Montmorency (1493-1567): Le Conseiller Médiocre". In Michon, Cédric (ed.). Les Conseillers de François Ier. Presses Universitaires de Rennes.
- Roelker, Nancy (1968). Queen of Navarre: Jeanne d'Albret 1528-1572. Harvard University Press.
- Sainte-Marie, Anselme de (1733). Histoire généalogique et chronologique de la maison royale de France, des pairs, grands officiers de la Couronne, de la Maison du Roy et des anciens barons du royaume: Tome I. La compagnie des libraires.
- Scheurer, Rémy (2011). "Jean Du Bellay (1492 ou 1498/1499-1560". In Michon, Cédric (ed.). Les Conseillers de François Ier. Presses Universitaires de Rennes.
- Vellet, Christophe (2011). "Entre Légistes et Ministres: Antoine Duprat (1463-1535), Conseiller Technicien de François Ier". In Michon, Cédric (ed.). Les Conseillers de François Ier. Presses Universitaires de Rennes.
- Vissière, Laurent (2011). "Louis II de La Trémoille (1460-1525): Au Service de François Ier". In Michon, Cédric (ed.). Les Conseillers de François Ier. Presses Universitaires de Rennes.

Preceded by François I	Count of Vendôme; 1495–1514	Succeeded by title was elevated to peerage-duchy
Preceded by title was elevated from countship	Duke of Vendôme; 1514–1537	Succeeded by Antoine de Bourbon
