= Charlotte Gouffier =

15th-century French royal governess

- Lady of Brissac
- Born: 1482; Kingdom of France
- Died: Unknown; Kingdom of France
- Noble family: Gouffier
- Spouses: Rene de Cossé, Lord of Brissac
- Issue: Charles de Cossé, Count of Brissac; Artus de Cossé-Brissac
- Father: Guillaume Gouffier, Lord of Boisy
- Mother: Philippine de Montmorency

Charlotte Gouffier, Madame de Brissac (born 1482) was a French noblewoman and courtier who served as the Governess of the Children of France.

== Biography ==
Gouffier de Boisy was born in 1482 to Guillaume Gouffier, Lord of Boisy and Philippine de Montmorency. She was a sister of Artus Gouffier, Lord of Boissy, Adrian Gouffier de Boissy, and Guillaume Gouffier, seigneur de Bonnivet. She was a first cousin of Anne de Montmorency.

In 1503 she married Rene de Cossé, Lord of Cossé and Brissac. She was the mother of Charles de Cossé, Count of Brissac and the grandmother of Charles II de Cossé, Duke of Brissac.

In 1518 she was appointed as the Governess of the Children of France, a post previously held by Guillemette de Sarrebruck. As royal governess she was in charge of the education of the children of Francis I of France.

Court offices
Preceded by Michelle de Saubonne	Governess of the Children of France; 1518-?	Succeeded by Guillemette de Sarrebruck
