= Gouffier =

French noble family from Poitou

Coat of arms of Artus

The Gouffier family was an old French noble family that owned the estate of Bonnivet in Poitou from the 14th century. There were many branches of this family, the chief of them being the dukes of Roannais, the counts of Caravas, the lords of Crévecoeur and of Bonnivet, the marquises of Thois, of Brazeux, and of Espagny. The name of Gouffier was adopted in the 18th century by a branch of the house of Choiseul, to produce the house of Choiseul-Gouffier.

== Genealogy ==
- Guillaume Gouffier, chamberlain to Charles VII, was an inveterate enemy of Jacques Coeur, obtaining his condemnation and afterwards receiving his property (1491). He had a great number of children, several of whom played a part in history:
  - Artus Gouffier, seigneur de Boisy (c. 1475–1520) was entrusted with the education of the young count of Angoulême, and on the accession of this prince to the throne as Francis I became grand master of the royal household, playing an important part in the government; to him was given the task of negotiating the treaty of Noyon in 1516; and shortly before his death the king raised the estates of Roanne and Boisy to the rank of a duchy, that of Roannais, in his favor.
    - Claude Gouffier, son of Artus, was created comte de Maulevrier (1542) and marquis de Boisy (1564).
  - Adrien Gouffier (died 1523) was bishop of Coutances and bishop of Albi, and grand almoner of France.
  - Guillaume Gouffier, became admiral of France.
  - Charlotte Gouffier de Boisy, Governess to the Children of France
  - Aymar Gouffier de Boisy (died 1528), bishop of Albi
