= Adrien Gouffier de Boissy =

French Roman Catholic bishop and cardinal

Adrien Gouffier de Boissy (died 1523) was a French Roman Catholic bishop and cardinal.

A member of the Gouffier family, Adrien Gouffier de Boissy was born in the Kingdom of France, ca. 1479. He was the son of Guillaume Gouffier, Lord of Boissy, sénéchal of Saintonge, and of Philippine de Montmorency, daughter of Jean II de Montmorency and a member of the House of Montmorency. He was the brother of Artus Gouffier, Lord of Boissy, Charlotte Gouffier de Boisy, and of Guillaume Gouffier, seigneur de Bonnivet. His father's first wife was Louise d'Amboise, sister of Cardinal Georges d'Amboise.

Destined for the church from an early age, he became a protonotary apostolic at age 14. He was made dean of Thouars in 1503. On 15 April 1510 he was elected Bishop of Coutances; he subsequently occupied the see until 6 June 1519.

During the conference of Bologna, 10 December 1515, Francis I of France personally asked Pope Leo X to elevate Bishop Gouffier to the cardinalate. As such, the pope made him a cardinal priest in the consistory of 14 December 1515. He received the red hat and the titular church of Santi Marcellino e Pietro al Laterano the same day.

In November 1516, Francis I of France named him Grand Almoner of France. On 8 November 1517 he opted for the titular church of Santa Balbina. He served as papal legate to the Kingdom of France from 23 March 1519 until 1520. He also became the administrator of the see of Albi on 6 June 1519. He did not participate in the papal conclave of 1521-22 that elected Pope Adrian VI.

He died at the château de Villendren-sur-Indre near Issoudun on 24 July 1523. He was buried in Bourgueil Abbey.
