= Balt (company) =

French medical equipment company

- Industry: Agents specialized in the trade of other specific products (French)
- Founded: 1977; 49 years ago
- Founder: Leopold Płowiecki
- Headquarters: Montmorency, France

Balt is a medical equipment manufacturer specializing in medical devices designed to treat stroke and other neurovascular diseases.

== History ==
Balt was established in 1977 in France as a small family business by Leopold Płowiecki. His son, Nicolas, oversaw the company's growth until 2018. In 2015, Bridgepoint Advisers acquired a stake in the company, and Balt began to expand internationally. Pascal Girin, who had been s CEO of Balt International since 2016, was appointed CEO of the entire company in late 2018.

Balt initially focused on plastic micro-tubes for the pharmaceutical industry. In 1987, it developed a microcatheter enabling the treatment of arteriovenous malformations. The Silk Vista Baby, one of the company's most recent innovations released in 2018, is the world's smallest collapsible intracranial stent.

Balt's revenues tripled between 2015 and 2020 and its workforce, quadrupled to reach 500 employees worldwide in 2020. Balt sells its production to 100 countries around the world. Between 2016 and 2019, the company acquired the American start-up Blockade Medical, which also produces medical devices, as well as several of its distributors in Europe, China, India and Brazil. Today, Balt operates in ten locations worldwide.
