= Alice Ozy =

French actress and courtesan

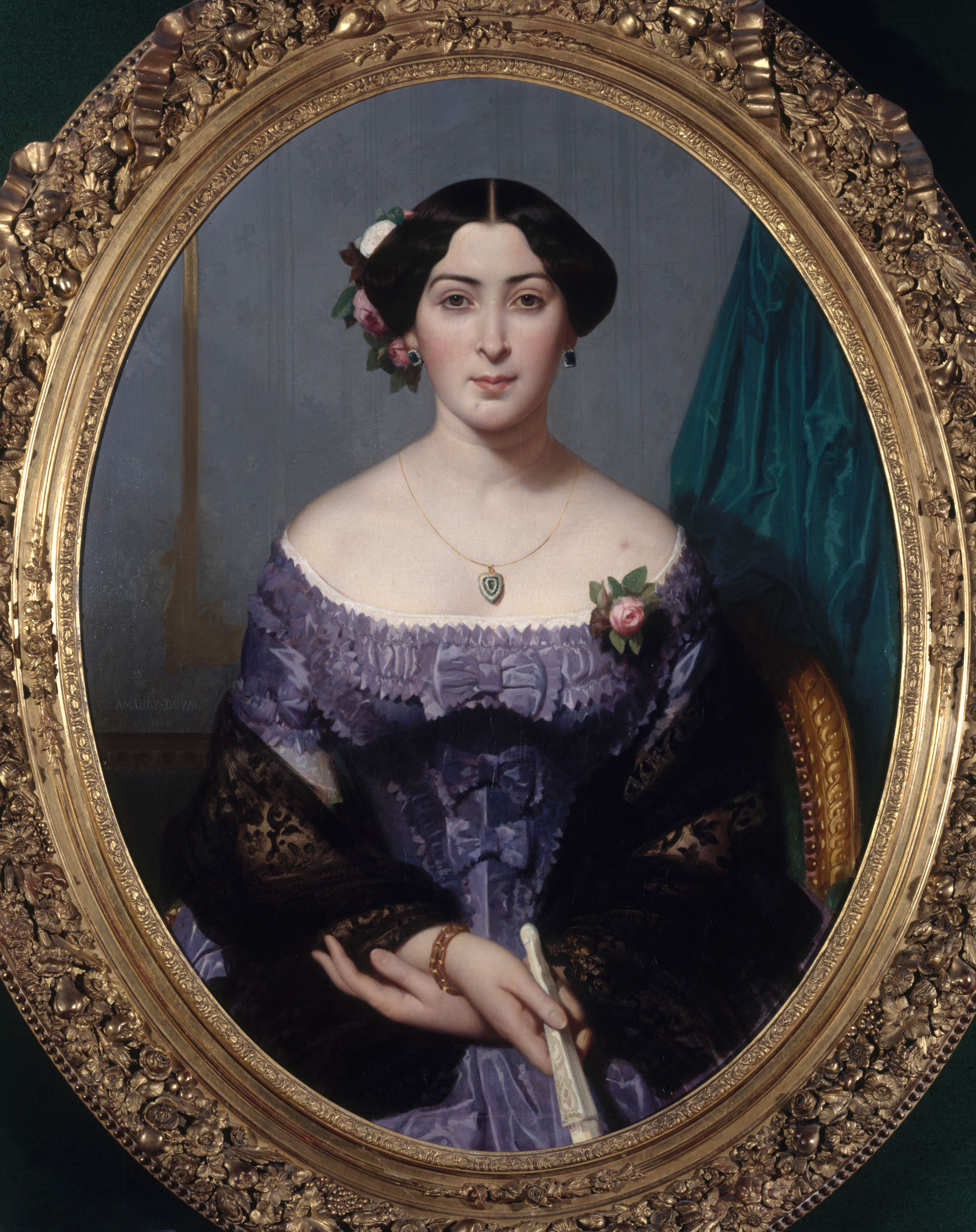
- Portrait of Alice Ozy (1852) by Eugène-Emmanuel Amaury-Duval, Musée Carnavalet
- Born: Julie Justine Pilloy; 6 August 1820; Paris, France
- Died: 4 March 1893 (aged 72); Paris, France
- Burial place: Père-Lachaise cemetery
- Occupations: Actress, courtesan

Julie Justine Pilloy (1820–1893), better known by her stage name Alice Ozy, was an actress and courtesan active during the mid-to-late 19th century. She was well known and liked for her roles in various performances, as well as being the subject of numerous paintings and poems by renowned artists. She was also a respected courtesan, and became associated with various wealthy and prominent men.

== Early life and acting career ==
Julie Justine Pilloy was born to Jean Baptiste Pilloy and Charlotte Amédée Ozi on 6 August 1820 in Paris, France. Her siblings included Charles Auguste Pilloy, born in 1818, and two half siblings on her father's side resulting from an affair. Charlotte placed Alice under the responsibility of a foster-mother until she was old enough to practice embroidery in Belleville, an apprenticeship which she began at about the age of 10.

During her time as an embroiderer, Ozy was inspired to enter the theatre when she met Paul-Louis-Edouard Brindeau, who soon became her lover. In 1840 at age 20, she gave her first performance of Les Enréges at the Théâtre des Variétés. This is also when she took on the name "Alice Ozy", an iteration of her mother's maiden name. She was admired by the public for her beauty rather than her acting skills. She used the admiration to her advantage to secure herself a comfortable lifestyle. In V'là c'qui juste d'paraître, 1846, Ozy famously shocked audience members with her costume: a flesh-colored bodysuit and a diamond headpiece which was said to be worth over 200,000 francs.

Ozy was a popular model for various artists including, but not limited to, Eugène-Emmanuel Amaury-Duval, Théodore Chassériau, Gustave Doré, and Thomas Couture. She was the subject of numerous paintings, illustrations, texts, and poems.

Some other notable performances featuring Ozy include Chaste Suzanne, 1839; La nuit aux soufflets, 1842; Un voyage en Espagne, 1843; La femme aux camélias, 1852; and Les femmes du monde, 1853.

== Courtesan ==
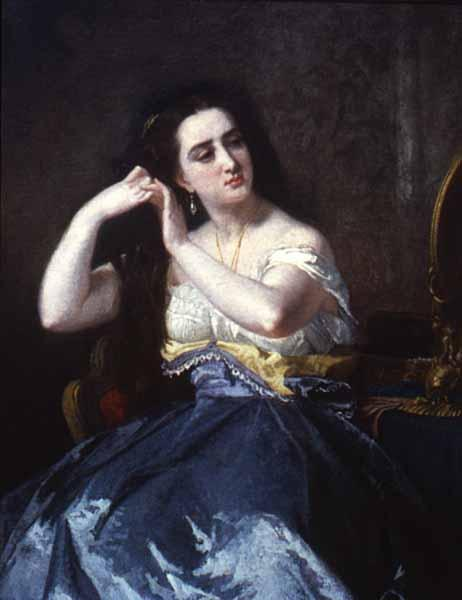
Alice Ozy (1855) by Thomas Couture, Toledo Museum of Art

At just age 13, Ozy was sexually assaulted by the owner of the embroidery shop in Belleville where she worked, causing a scandal which led to the cancellation of a potential marriage proposal from a local doctor. This unfortunate incident led to her career as a courtesan, and for Alice, substantially changed her perspective of marriage. Ozy was desired for her naivety and innocence, but she was anything but socially inept. She was known for her sharp wit, wisdom regarding her personal finances, and ability to carry herself with poise. She was a fashionable and respected member of the demimonde, and solidified her status as a salonnière. When selecting her lovers, she is said to have favored wealthy men who could support her, although she maintained a place in her heart for those who pursued creative expression as well.

The first man she was involved with was Brindeau, who introduced her to the theatre. It was not long, however, until she moved on to the Duc d'Aumale. He was the son of King Louis-Philippe and Queen Marie-Amélie, and he won Ozy over after her performance of Le Chevaleir du Guet at Tuileries. However, this arrangement was also short-lived as the Duc d'Aumale did not yet have control over his own money. Ozy instead became the mistress of Comte de Perregaux, a banker who could better financially provide for her. As her career progressed, Ozy became involved with other men including Théophile Gautier, the Duc de Morny, Victor Hugo, Charles Hugo, and Chassériau.

== Late life and death ==
In 1855 at age 35, Ozy began to conclude her dazzling stage career. She was supported by a Monsieur Groening for some time, a rich man with whom she did not engage sexually. Rather, during this time Ozy had an affair with Edmond About, until she eventually took on her final lover Gustave Doré.

She spent the later portion of her life privately between her homes. Ozy's apartment on the Boulevard Haussmann was filled with tokens of her life, including paintings and drawings for which she modeled as well as various luxury objects. Her châlet at the shore of Lake Enghein was known for being spectacularly decorated with roses during summertime.

After she left the stage, Ozy gave up her stage name and returned to being called Madame Pilloy. On 3-4 March 1893, she died peacefully in her home on Boulevard Haussmann. Her vast fortune was left to charity.

== Gallery ==
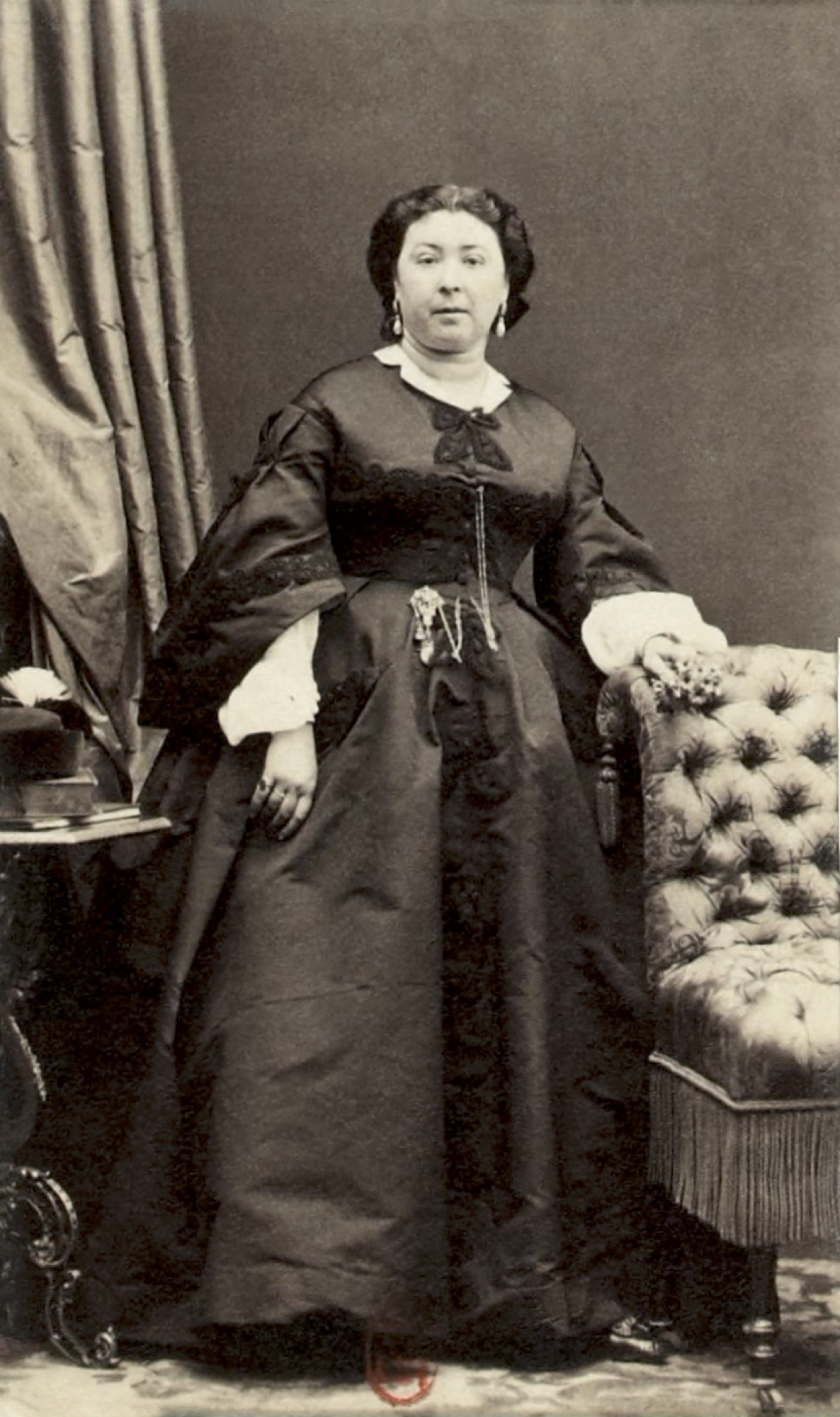
Portrait of Alice Ozy by the studio of André Adolphe-Eugène Disdéri, 1860-1890, albumen print, Musée Carnavalet, Paris, France

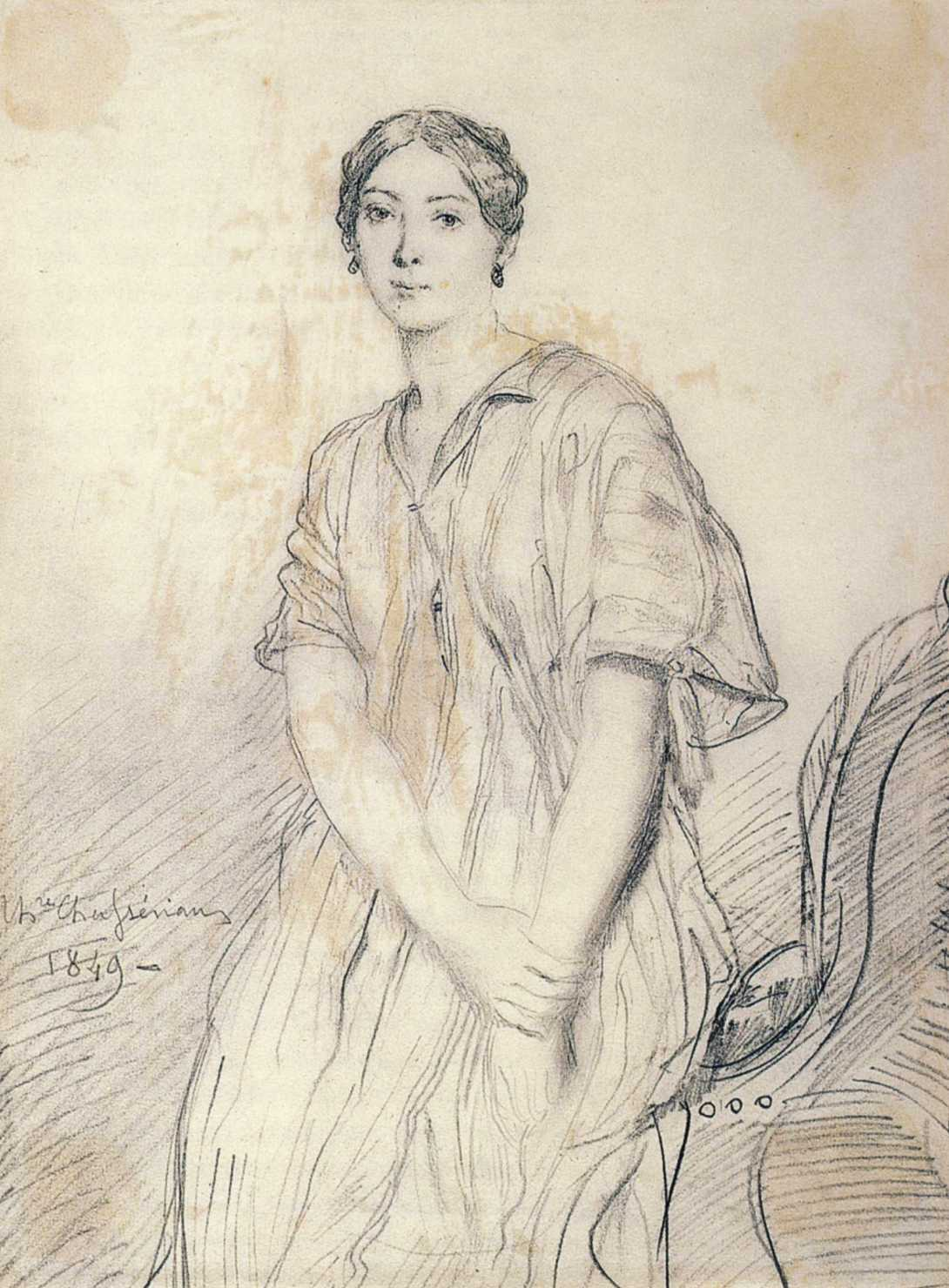
Alice Ozy by Théodore Chassériau, 1849, graphite, Musée Carnavalet, Paris, France
