= Hôtel de Ville, Montmorency =

Town hall in Montmorency, France

Hôtel de Ville
- The main frontage of the Hôtel de Ville in October 2024
- Interactive map of the Hôtel de Ville area

General information
- Type: City hall
- Architectural style: Neoclassical style
- Location: Montmorency, France
- Coordinates: 48.9895°N 2.3208°E
- Completed: 1791

Design and construction
- Architect: Pierre Lerride

The Hôtel de Ville (French pronunciation: [otɛl də vil], City Hall) is a municipal building in Montmorency, Val-d'Oise, in the northern suburbs of Paris, standing on Avenue Foch.

== History ==
The old town hall

=== The old town hall ===
The first municipal building in the town was a courthouse commissioned by the local provost (magistrate) under the ancien régime. The site selected was on the north side of the town square (now Place de l'Auditoire). It was designed in neoclassical style, built in ashlar stone and was completed in 1786.

The design involved a symmetrical main frontage of five bays facing onto the square. The central bay featured a round headed doorway with voussoirs and a keystone. On the first floor, there was a French door with a balustrade and a balcony, and there was a clock above with a lantern behind. The outer bays were fenestrated by segmental-headed windows with voussoirs on the ground floor, and by casement windows with moulded surrounds on the first floor and, at roof level, there a balustraded parapet. Internally, in addition to a courtroom, there were cells for the incarceration of petty criminals.

Following the French Revolution the new town council initially met in the Church of Notre-Dame at the corner of Rues au Pain and Rue de Notre-Dame but, in 1809, they purchased the former courthouse and subsequently used it as a town hall.

=== The current town hall ===
Inside the current town hall

In the early 20th century, following significant population growth, the council led by the mayor, Théophile Vacher, decided to acquire a more substantial municipal building. The building they selected was a fine villa on the north side of what is now Avenue Foch. The building had been commissioned by a wealthy Parisien businessman, Nicolas Louis Goix, in the mid-1780s. Construction of the building commenced in 1788. It was designed by Pierre Lerride in the neoclassical style, built in ashlar stone and was completed in 1791.

The design involved a symmetrical main frontage of five bays facing north towards what is now Avenue Rey de Foresta. The central bay, which was slightly projected forward, featured a square-headed doorway with an ornate surround, surmounted by a row of medallions and a cornice. On the first floor, there was a casement window surmounted by a mask and a triangular pediment and, at attic level, there was an open pediment with a clock in the tympanum. The outer bays were fenestrated by round-headed windows with archivolts on the ground floor, by square-headed windows with moulded surrounds on the first floor and by oculi at attic level. The whole building was surmounted by a cornice and a balustraded parapet.

The building was acquired by a merchant, Antoine Versepuy, in 1826, by an army commissary and banker, Joseph Moreno de Mora, in 1831, and by a future mayor of the town, Emilien Rey de Foresta, in 1859. Rey de Foresta was responsible for landscaping the park. After his death, his daughter inherited the property and sold it to the council in 1906.

On 26 August 1944, during the Second World War, the French Forces of the Interior took part in fierce fighting with German troops in front of the old town hall; this was four days before the complete liberation of the town by the French 2nd Armoured Division, commanded by General Philippe Leclerc, on 30 August 1944. After the war, plaques were placed on either side of the front door of the current town hall to commemorate the liberation of the town as well as the French individuals who had died securing it.
