= Montmorency =

Montmorency may refer to:

== Literature ==
- Montmorency series, Victorian-era London suspense fiction books by Eleanor Updale
- Montmorency, a fictional dog in Jerome K. Jerome's novel Three Men in a Boat

== People ==
- Anne de Montmorency (1493–1567), French soldier, statesman and diplomat
- Charles I de Montmorency (d. 1381), French soldier
- Floris of Montmorency (1528–1570), noble and diplomat from the Spanish Netherlands
- François-Henri de Montmorency, duc de Luxembourg, (1628–1695), French general
- Henri II de Montmorency, (1595–1632), French noble and Viceroy of New France
- Philip de Montmorency (1524–1568), Count of Horn, Belgian born statesman from the Spanish Netherlands
- Rachel de Montmorency (1891–1961), English painter and stained glass artist
- Raymond de Montmorency (1867–1900), Canadian-born British Army officer and member of Anglo Irish family

== Places ==
=== In Australia ===
- Montmorency, Victoria, suburb of Melbourne
  - Montmorency railway station, Melbourne

=== In Canada ===
- Montmorency River, a tributary of St. Lawrence river in Capitale-Nationale, Quebec
  - Montmorency Falls, Quebec
  - Montmorency Forest, protected forest in Capitale-Nationale, Quebec
- Collège Montmorency, also known as Cégep Montmorency, a Francophone public college in Laval, Quebec
- Parc Montmorency, a park located in Quebec City and home to the Parliaments of Lower Canada, Canada East and Quebec from 1791 to 1883
- Montmorency station (Montreal Metro), a Montreal Metro station in Laval-des-Rapides, Laval, Quebec, serving the Orange Line
- Montmorency (federal electoral district), Quebec
- Montmorency (provincial electoral district), Quebec
- Montmorency, Quebec, a former municipality amalgamated in 1976 to form Beauport, Quebec City

=== In France ===
- Montmorency, Val-d'Oise, Val-d'Oise département
- Soisy-sous-Montmorency, Val-d'Oise département
- Montmorency-Beaufort, Aube département
- Rue de Montmorency, Paris

=== In United States ===
- Montmorenci, Indiana
- Montmorency County, Michigan
- Montmorency Township (disambiguation)

== Transit ==
- Montmorency station (Montreal Metro), a subway station Laval, Quebec, Canada
- Montmorency railway station, Victoria, in Montmorency, Victoria, Australia

== Other uses ==
- Duke of Montmorency, a title that was created several times for members of the Montmorency family
- House of Montmorency, one of the oldest noble families in France
- Montmorency cherry, a variety of sour cherry
