= Soilhyo Mété =

French footballer (born 1988)

Personal information
- Date of birth: 5 January 1988 (age 38)
- Place of birth: Soisy-sous-Montmorency, France
- Height: 1.76 m (5 ft 9 in)
- Position: Defender

Senior career*
Years	Team	Apps	(Gls)
2005–2008	Nantes B		
2006–2007	Nantes	1	(0)
2008–2010	Red Star	48	(5)
2012	Racing Colombes 92	4	(0)
2012–2013	Chambly	8	(0)
- * Club domestic league appearances and goals

Soilhyo Mété (born 5 January 1988), also commonly spelled Soilyho Mété, is a French former professional footballer who played as a defender.

== Career ==
An FC Nantes youth product, Mété made one appearance in Ligue 1 for the club.

After being released by Nantes, Mété joined Championnat de France Amateur club Red Star where he established himself in the club's defence and became the team's captain, helping his side concede just 11 goals in 15 matches.

In June 2012 Mété moved to Racing Colombes 92 of the Championnat de France Amateur 2.
