= Enghien-les-Bains =

- Commune
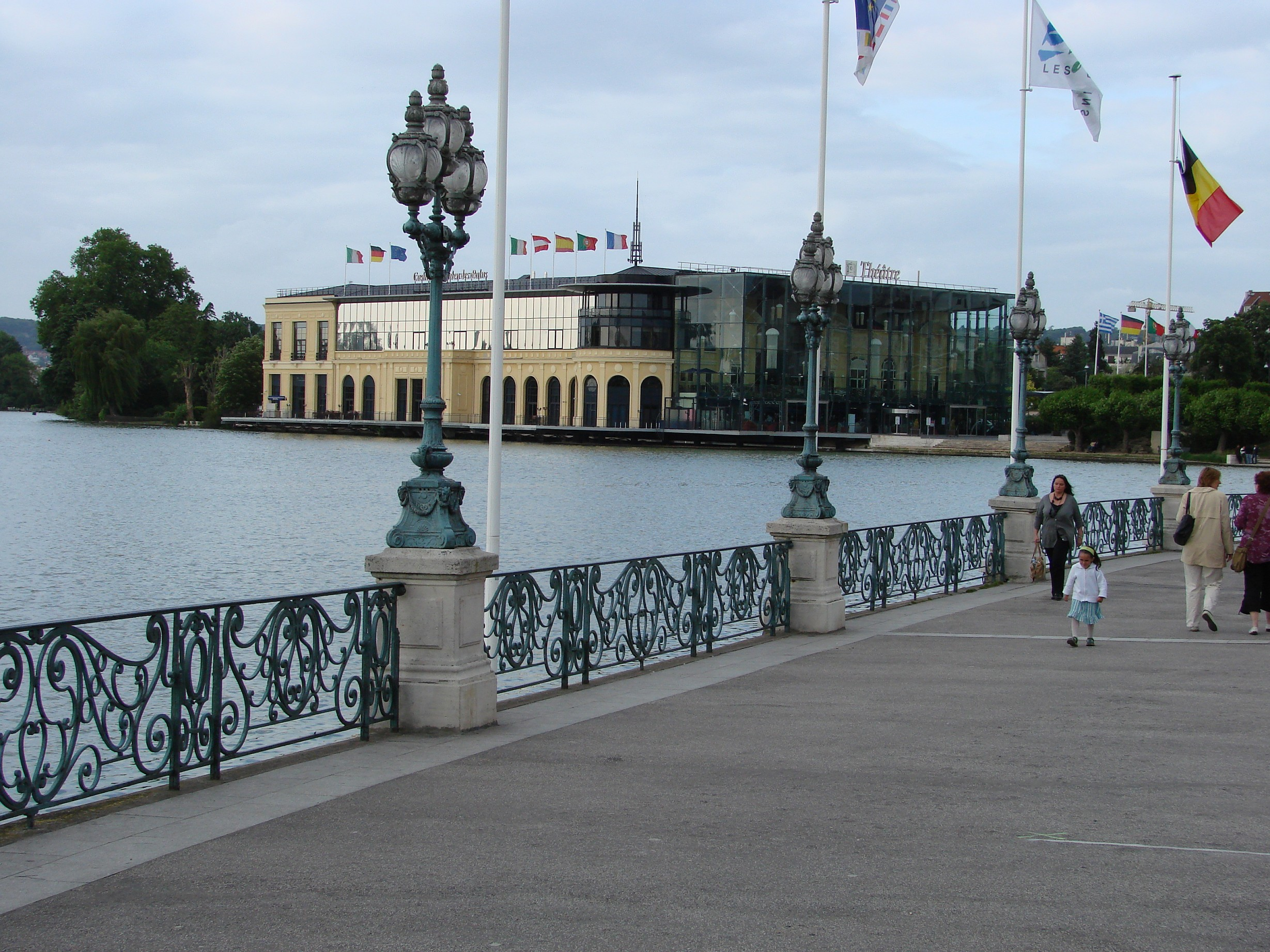
- Boardwalk by the Lake of Enghien in the town centre. In the background is the Casino of Enghien-les-Bains

- Coat of arms

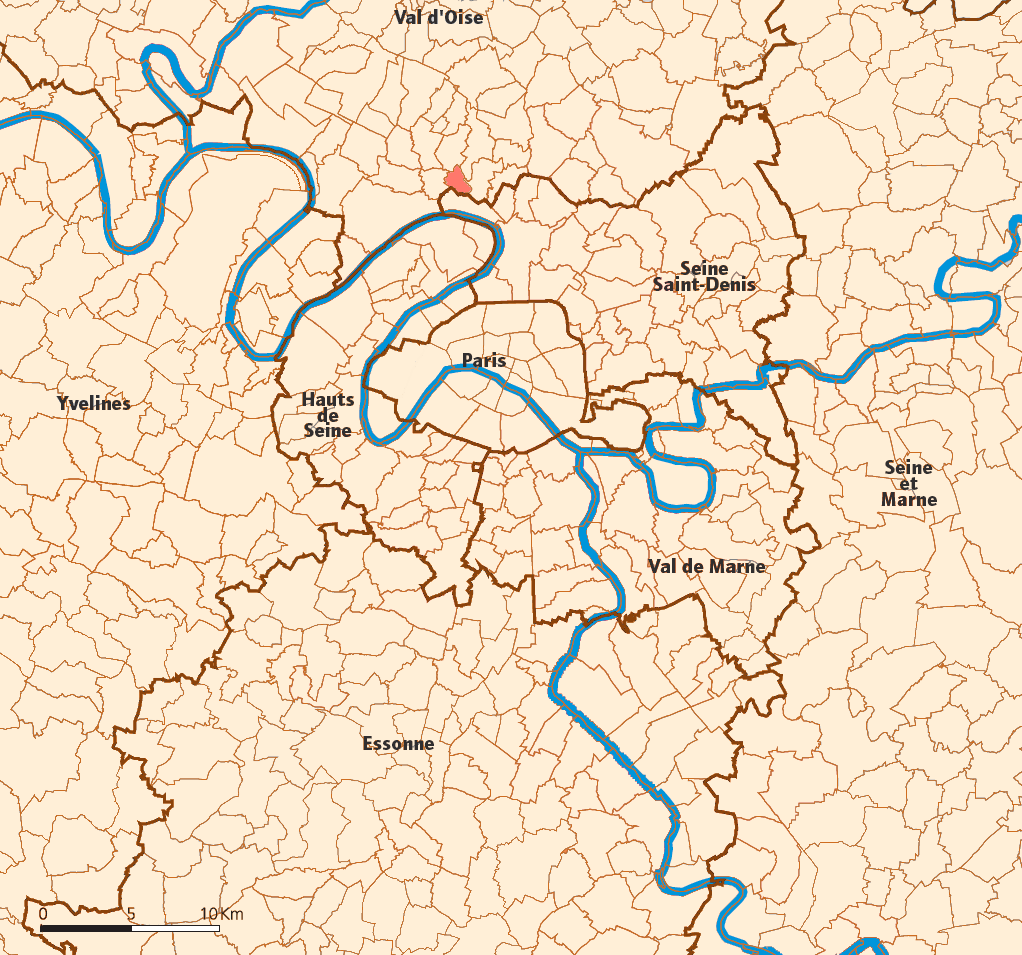
- Location (in red) within Paris inner and outer suburbs
- Location of Enghien-les-Bains
- Location within France Location within Île-de-France (region)
- Coordinates: 48°58′11″N 2°18′29″E
- Country: France
- Region: Île-de-France
- Department: Val-d'Oise
- Arrondissement: Sarcelles
- Canton: Montmorency
- Intercommunality: CA Plaine Vallée

Government
  - Mayor (2020–2026): Philippe Sueur (DVD)
- Area^{1}: 1.77 km^{2} (0.68 sq mi)
- Highest elevation: 53 m (174 ft)
- Lowest elevation: 33 m (108 ft)
- Population (2023): 11,432
  - Density: 6,460/km^{2} (16,700/sq mi)
- Demonym: Enghiennois
- Time zone: UTC+01:00 (CET)
  - Summer (DST): UTC+02:00 (CEST)
- INSEE/Postal code: 95210 /95880
- Website: www.enghienlesbains.fr
- ^{1} French Land Register data, which excludes lakes, ponds, glaciers > 1 km^{2} (0.386 sq mi or 247 acres) and river estuaries.

Enghien-les-Bains (French pronunciation: [ɑ̃ɡɛ̃ le bɛ̃]; lit. 'Enghien-the-Baths') or simply Enghien is a commune in the department of Val-d'Oise, France. It is located in the northern outer suburbs of Paris on the departmental border with Seine-Saint-Denis, 13.5 kilometres (8.4 mi) from the centre of Paris.

Enghien-les-Bains is famous as a spa resort and a well-to-do suburb of Paris, developed in the 19th century around the scenic Lake of Enghien. A casino, the only one in the vicinity of Paris, is located on the shores of the lake.

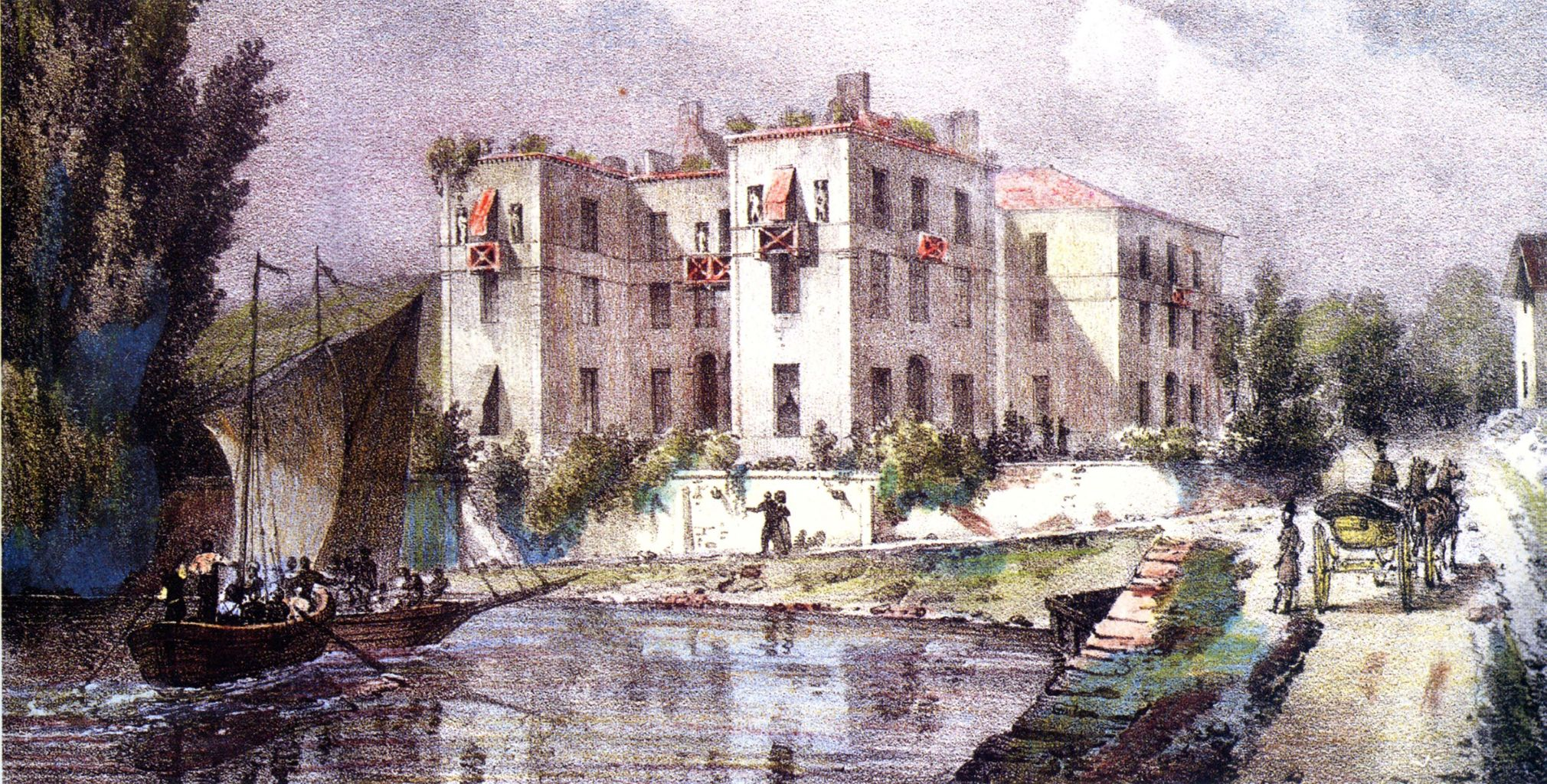
The Hotel des Quatre Pavillons, c. 1825

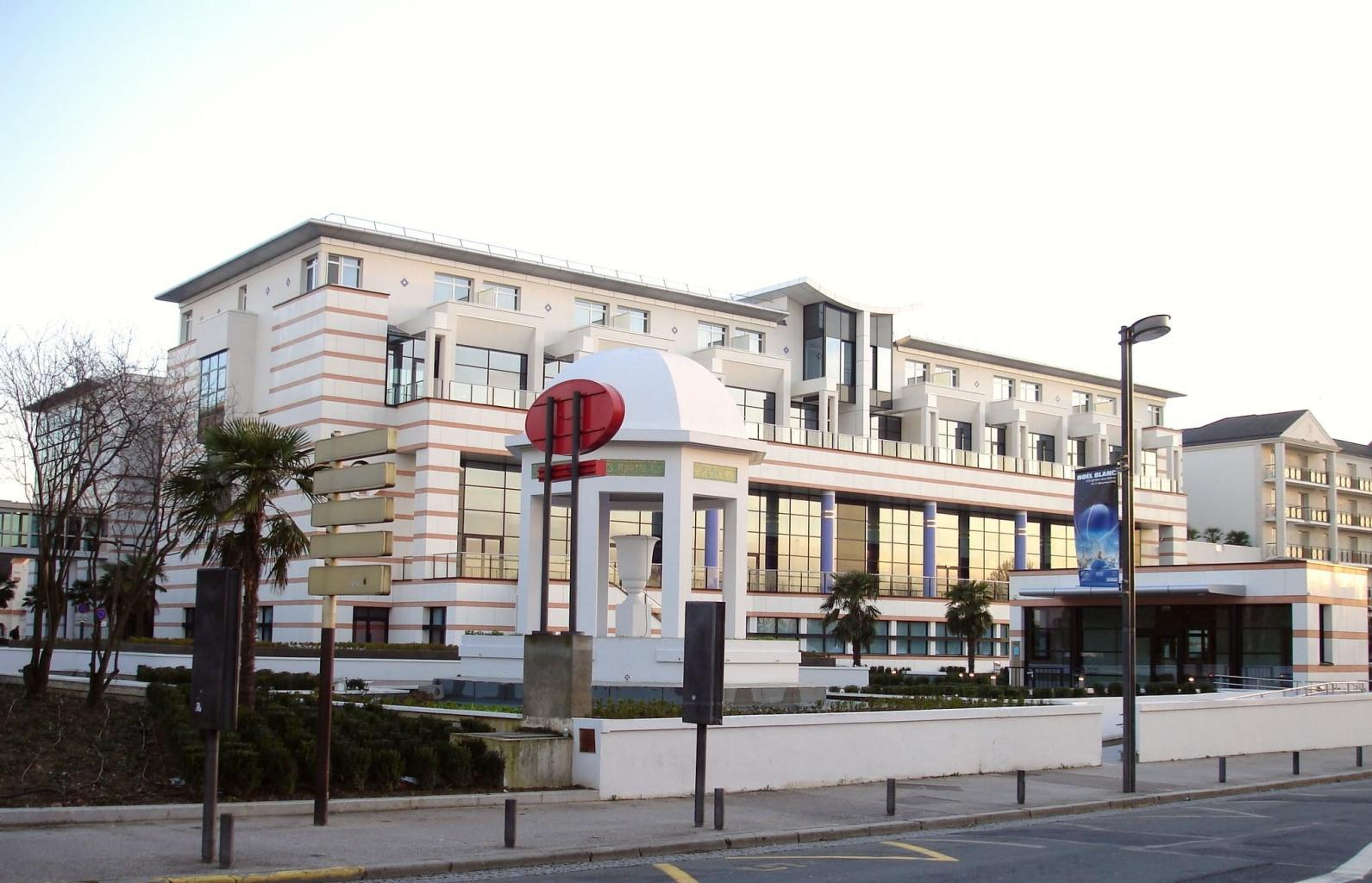
The thermal baths

== Name ==
The suffix les Bains (literally "the Baths") was added to the name when the commune was incorporated in 1850, to distinguish this place from the Belgian city of Enghien, near Mons, and to acknowledge the thermal baths for which Enghien-les-Bains is famous.

The name Enghien itself does refer to the Belgian city, which was a fief of the princes of Condé, a cadet branch of the French royal family, who inherited the duchy of Montmorency in 1633. In 1689 they were allowed by King Louis XIV to rename the duchy of Montmorency to be the "duchy of Enghien", in order to revive the title, duc d'Enghien, which they had lost in 1569 at the death of Louis I de Bourbon, prince de Condé, who had not legally registered the title.

The village of Montmorency (now a city) continued to be known as "Montmorency", despite the official name change, but the name "Enghien" clung to the nearby lake and marshland that would later become the commune of Enghien-les-Bains.

== History ==
Before the French Revolution, what is now Enghien-les-Bains was a lake and a marshland under the jurisdiction of Montmorency.

In 1766, a priest at the oratory of Montmorency discovered a warm sulphur spring near the lake of Enghien, and the area began to develop as a spa resort.

At the creation of the communes in 1790, during the French Revolution, the area of Enghien was withdrawn from the jurisdiction of Montmorency and divided between several communes.

In the nineteenth century, the development of Enghien led to its incorporation as a commune. The commune, which was named Enghien-les-Bains, was created on 7 August 1850 by detaching a part of the territory of Deuil-la-Barre and merging it with a part of the territory of Saint-Gratien, a part of the territory of Soisy-sous-Montmorency, and a part of the territory of Épinay-sur-Seine.

== Population ==
Historical population
Year	Pop.	±% p.a.
1968	12,152	—
1975	10,712	−1.79%
1982	9,739	−1.35%
1990	10,077	+0.43%
1999	10,368	+0.32%
2007	12,199	+2.05%
2012	11,410	−1.33%
2017	11,228	−0.32%
2023	11,432	+0.30%
Source: INSEE

== Transport ==
Enghien-les-Bains is served by two stations on the Transilien Paris-Nord suburban rail line: La Barre–Ormesson and Enghien-les-Bains.

== Education ==
Kindergartens include:

- Les Cygnes
- Raoul Riet
- Sainte-Thérèse

Primary schools include:

- Ormesson 1
- Ormesson 2
- Saint-Louis

Middle schools include:

- Collège Notre Dame Providence
- Collège Georges Pompidou

High schools include:

- Lycée Gustave Monod
- Lycée Notre Dame Providence

== Casino ==
Known as the biggest place to gamble near Paris, Enghien les Bains casino, which opened in 1901 was recently renovated to provide luxury and comfort to all tourists traveling to the capital of France. It is operated by Groupe Lucien Barrière.

The resort has two hotels and offers to the guests the opportunity to dine in one of its many restaurants. You will also find bars and a theater where concerts and shows are organized.

On the first floor of the casino, you will find nearly 40 table games featuring Blackjack, Punto Banco in addition to French and English Roulette.

== International relations ==
=== Twin towns ===
Enghien-les-Bains is twinned with:

- Enghien, Belgium (1957)
- Bad Dürrheim, Germany (1992)

=== Partner cities ===
- Novi Sad, Serbia (2020)

== Notable people ==
- Cyril Akpomedah (b. *1979), basketball player
- Marcel Bleustein-Blanchet (1906–1996), member of the Free French resistance and founder of the Publicis advertising empire
- Aurelien Collin (b. 1986), Football player for New York Red Bulls of Major League Soccer
- Boris Derichebourg (b. 1978), racing driver and President of Derichebourg Multiservices
- John Jonas Gruen (1926−2016), art critic, photographer and composer
- Johanna Joseph (b. 1992), basketball player
- Alphonse Laurencic (1902–1939), Republican activist and trade unionist in Spain
- Laurine Lecavelier (b. 1996), figure skater
- Philippe Méaille (b. 1973), Contemporary Art collector
- Denis Ménochet (b. 1976), actor
- Mistinguett (1875-1956), actress and singer
- Nathaniel Virayie (b. 1961), professional footballer

== See also ==
- Communes of the Val-d'Oise department
