= Andilly, Val-d'Oise =

Andilly
- Commune
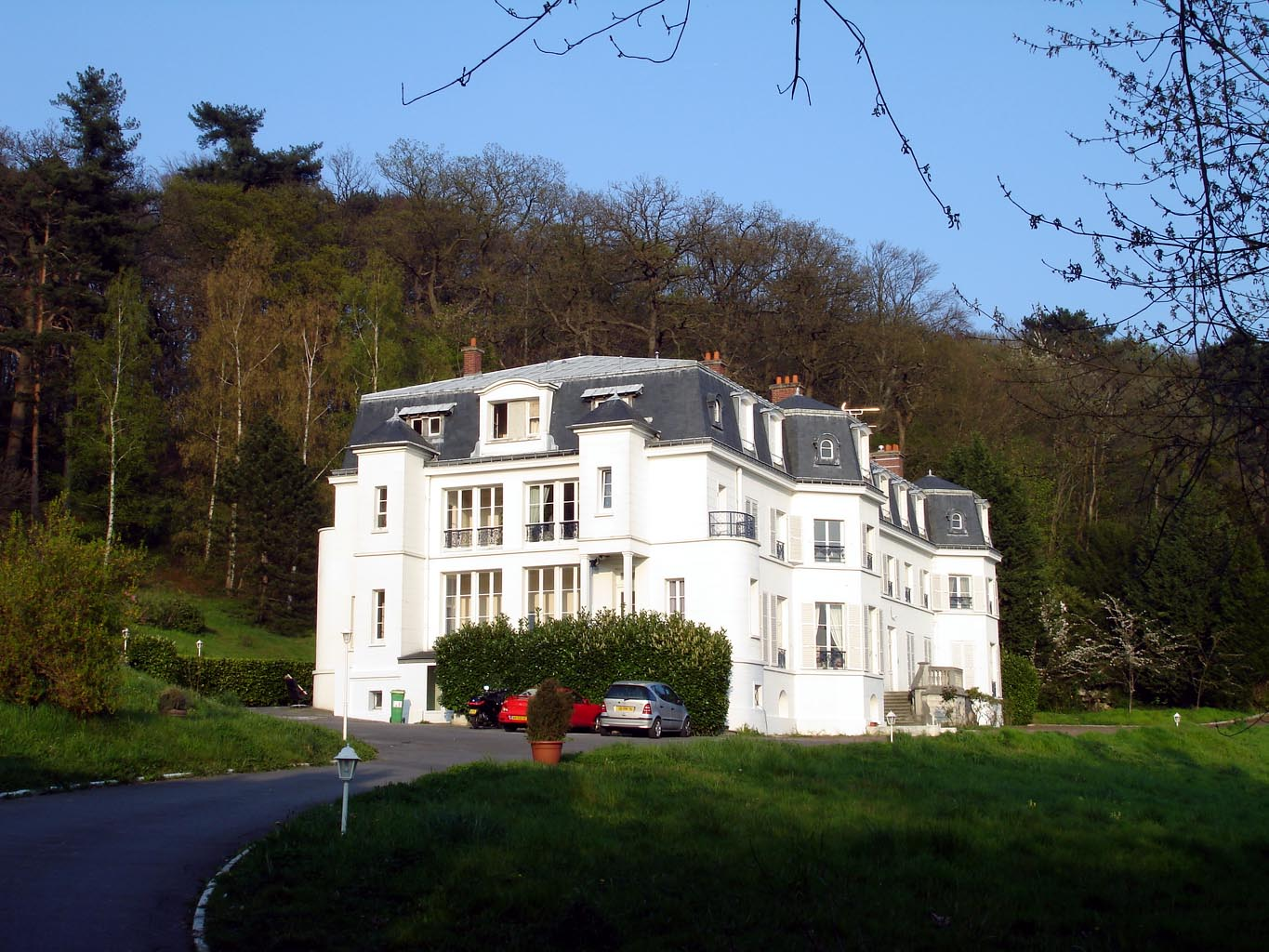
- Château de Belmont

- Coat of arms
- Location of Andilly
- Location within France Location within Île-de-France (region)
- Coordinates: 49°00′21″N 2°18′01″E
- Country: France
- Region: Île-de-France
- Department: Val-d'Oise
- Arrondissement: Sarcelles
- Canton: Montmorency
- Intercommunality: CA Plaine Vallée

Government
  - Mayor (2023–2026): Philippe Feugere
- Area^{1}: 2.70 km^{2} (1.04 sq mi)
- Population (2023): 2,742
  - Density: 1,020/km^{2} (2,630/sq mi)
- Time zone: UTC+01:00 (CET)
  - Summer (DST): UTC+02:00 (CEST)
- INSEE/Postal code: 95014 /95580
- ^{1} French Land Register data, which excludes lakes, ponds, glaciers > 1 km^{2} (0.386 sq mi or 247 acres) and river estuaries.

Andilly (French pronunciation: [ɑ̃diji]) is a commune in the Val-d'Oise department in Île-de-France in northern France.

== Population ==
Historical population

Year	Pop.	±% p.a.
1793	351	—
1821	320	−0.33%
1846	390	+0.79%
1872	507	+1.01%
1886	647	+1.76%
1901	828	+1.66%
1921	653	−1.18%
1931	1,017	+4.53%
1936	848	−3.57%
1946	863	+0.18%
1954	1,141	+3.55%

Year	Pop.	±% p.a.
1962	1,277	+1.42%
1968	1,519	+2.93%
1975	1,652	+1.21%
1982	1,589	−0.55%
1990	2,116	+3.65%
1999	2,013	−0.55%
2007	2,449	+2.48%
2012	2,530	+0.65%
2017	2,590	+0.47%
2023	2,742	+0.96%

Source: EHESS and INSEE (1968-2023)

== See also ==
- Communes of the Val-d'Oise department
