= Soisy-sous-Montmorency =

- Commune
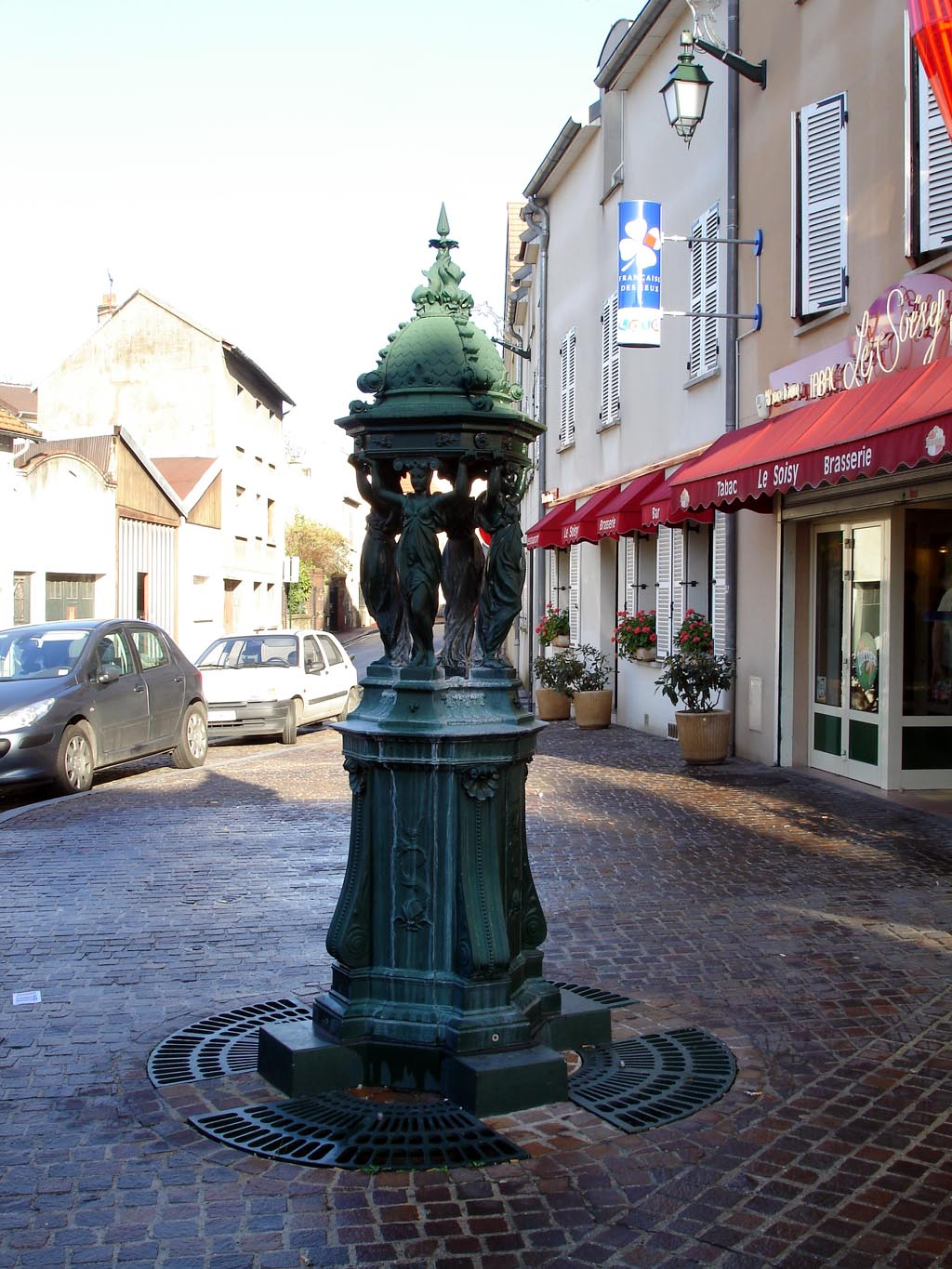
- Place Sestre, the Wallace fountain

- Coat of arms

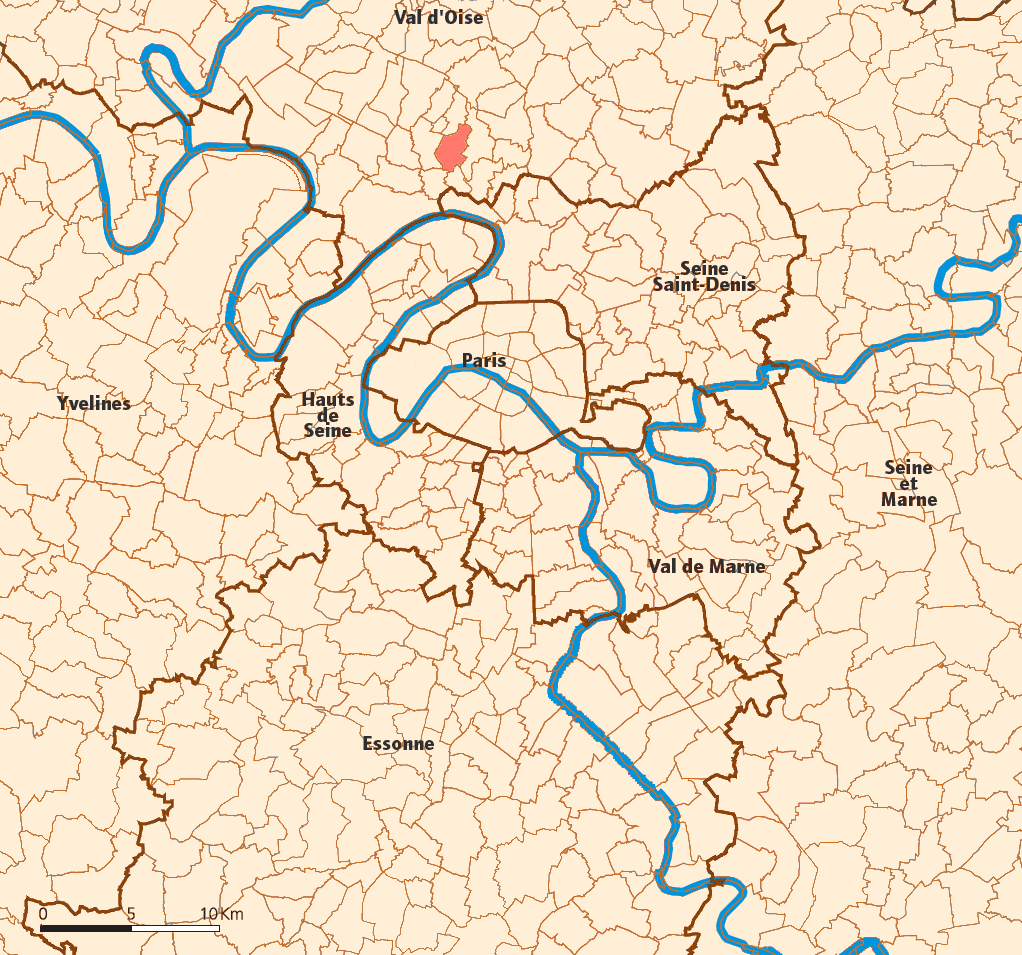
- Location (in red) within Paris inner and outer suburbs
- Location of Soisy-sous-Montmorency
- Location within France Location within Île-de-France (region)
- Coordinates: 48°59′19″N 2°18′02″E
- Country: France
- Region: Île-de-France
- Department: Val-d'Oise
- Arrondissement: Sarcelles
- Canton: Montmorency
- Intercommunality: CA Plaine Vallée

Government
  - Mayor (2026–32): Nicolas Naudet
- Area^{1}: 3.98 km^{2} (1.54 sq mi)
- Population (2023): 18,008
  - Density: 4,520/km^{2} (11,700/sq mi)
- Time zone: UTC+01:00 (CET)
  - Summer (DST): UTC+02:00 (CEST)
- INSEE/Postal code: 95598 /95230
- ^{1} French Land Register data, which excludes lakes, ponds, glaciers > 1 km^{2} (0.386 sq mi or 247 acres) and river estuaries.

Soisy-sous-Montmorency (French pronunciation: [swazi su mɔ̃mɔʁɑ̃si], lit. 'Soisy under Montmorency') is a commune in the Val-d'Oise department located 15.3 km (9.5 mi) north of Paris, France.

== History ==
On 7 August 1850, a part of the territory of Soisy-sous-Montmorency was detached and merged with a part of the territory of Saint-Gratien, a part of the territory of Deuil-la-Barre, and a part of the territory of Épinay-sur-Seine to create the commune of Enghien-les-Bains.

== Population ==
Historical population
Year	Pop.	±% p.a.
1968	14,552	—
1975	16,260	+1.60%
1982	15,894	−0.32%
1990	16,597	+0.54%
1999	16,802	+0.14%
2007	17,419	+0.45%
2012	17,534	+0.13%
2017	18,155	+0.70%
2023	18,008	−0.14%
Source: INSEE

== Sport ==
- Racecourse: Hippodrome d'Enghien-Soisy
- Sports stadium: Stade Albert Schweitzer home of the FC Soisy-Andilly-Margency.

== Transport ==
Soisy-sous-Montmorency is served by Champ de courses d'Enghien station on the SNCF Transilien Paris – Nord suburban rail line.

== Notable people ==
- Aristide Briand (1862–1932), statesman
- Ida Presti (1924–1967), classical guitarist and composer
- Georges Delerue (1925–1992), composer
- Alexandre Lagoya (1929–1999), classical guitarist
- Christian Noyer (b. 1950), economist
- Yann LeCun (b. 1960), French-American artificial intelligence researcher
- Emmanuel Renaut (b. 1968), chef (born in Soisy)
- Christophe Agnolutto (b. 1969), professional road bicycle racer (born in Soisy)
- Louis Saha (b. 1978), professional footballer (FC Soisy-Andilly-Margency)
- Ludwig Briand (b. 1981), actor (born in Soisy)
- Adrian Mannarino (b. 1988), professional tennis player (born in Soisy)
- Soilhyo Mété (b. 1988), Ivorian professional footballer
- Roxane Fournier (b. 1991), racing cyclist (born in Soisy)
- Thibault Rossard (b. 1993), volleyball player (born in Soisy)
- Alan Virginius (b. 2003) professional footballer (born in Soisy)

== Gallery ==
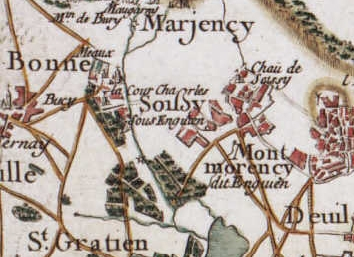
Map of Soisy about 1780 (Dominique, comte de Cassini)

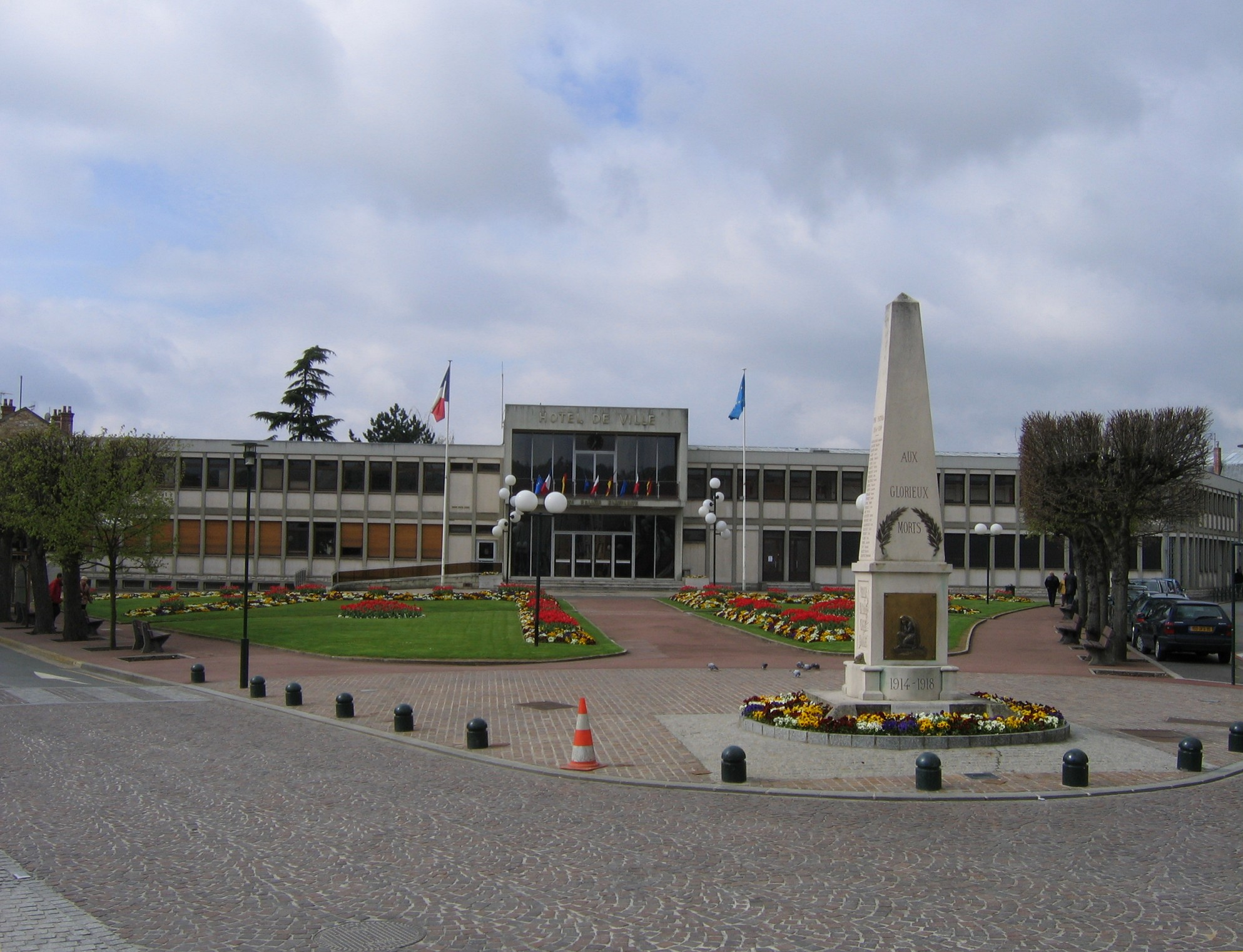
Town hall

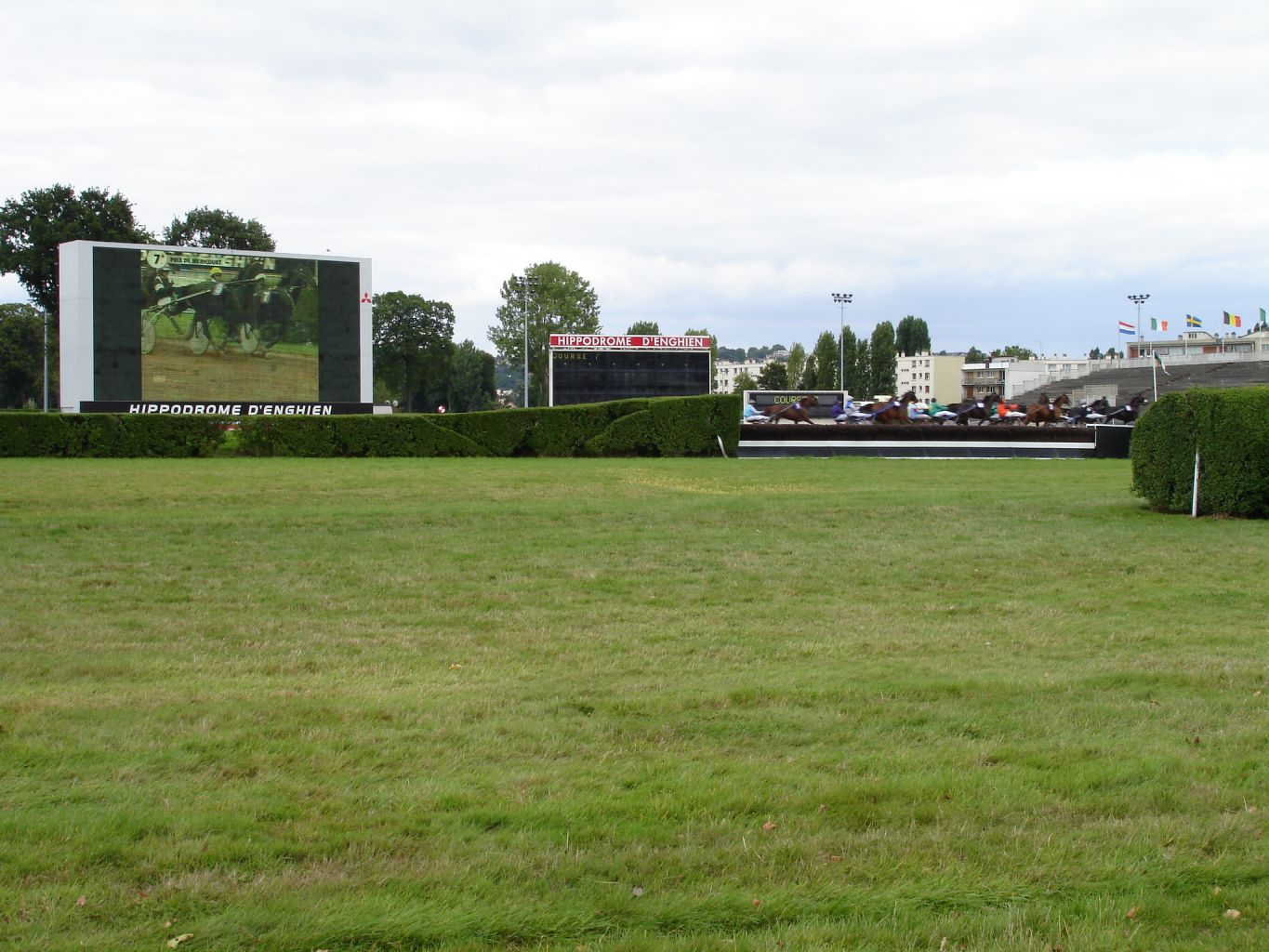
Hippodrome d'Enghien-Soisy (2005)

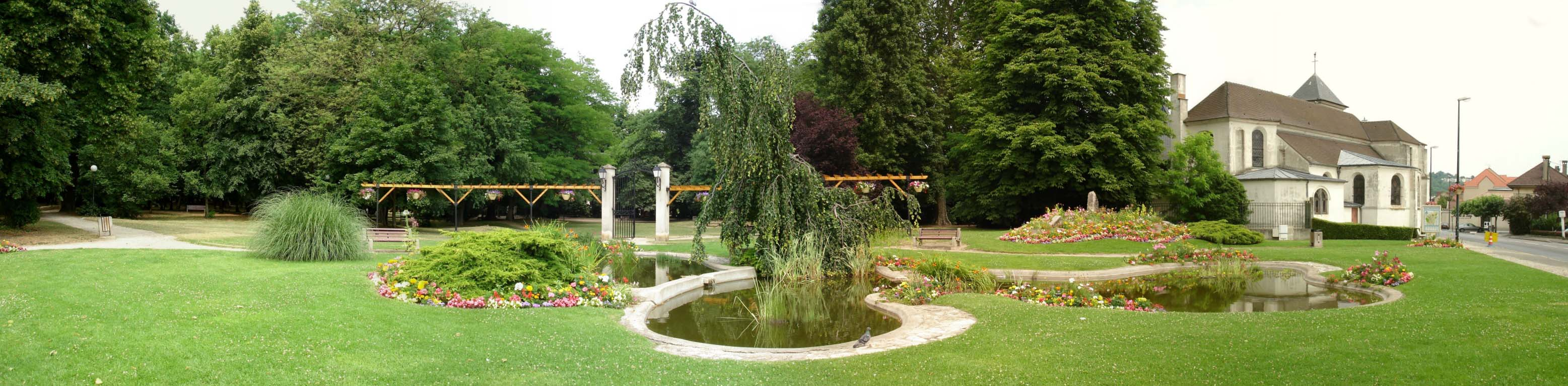
Church Saint-Germain and the Parc du Val-Ombreux

== See also ==
- Montmorency
- Communes of the Val-d'Oise department
