= Alphonse Laurencic =

French-Slovene painter and torturer

Alphonse Laurencic (2 July 1902 in Enghien-les-Bains, France – 9 July 1939 in Barcelona, Spain) was a French painter and architect. He is known for designing jail cells to torture captured supporters of the Nationalist faction of the Spanish Civil War.

== Biography ==
Alfonso Laurencic was born in France as the son of Slovene immigrants from the Austro-Hungarian Empire. Laurencic supported the Republican forces fighting Francisco Franco's Nationalist army in Spain. In 1938, he helped build Civil War jail cells intended to torture Nationalist supporters which resembled 3-D modern art paintings by surrealist Salvador Dalí and Bauhaus artist Wassily Kandinsky.

According to Spanish art historian Jose Milicua, who found papers from Laurencic's 1939 trial by a Nationalist military court, Laurencic told the court the cells, in Barcelona, featured sloping beds at a 20-degree angle and with a jagged texture that were almost impossible to sleep on. They also had irregularly shaped bricks protruding from the floor that prevent lying down and hinder any walking. The walls in the 2 m x 1 m cells were covered in surrealist patterns designed to make prisoners distressed and confused, and lighting effects were used to make the patterns even more dizzying. Some of them had a stone seat designed to make occupants instantly slide to the floor, while other cells were painted in tar and became stiflingly hot in the summer. The use of loud metronomes and clocks that run too fast or are frequently changed has also been described. Laurencic told the court, which mentioned the cells at his trial, that the cells were built after he heard reports of similar structures being built elsewhere in Spain.

Laurencic was executed on the morning of 9 July 1939.

== Bibliography ==
- Checas de Barcelona, de César Alcalá. Belacqua. Barcelona, 2005. ISBN 978-84-96326-44-6
- Las checas del terror, de César Alcalá. LibrosLibres. 2007. ISBN 978-84-96088-59-7
- La causa general, Akrón, 2008. ISBN 978-84-936011-8-8
- El terror staliniano en la España republicana, Felix Llaugé. Editorial Aura. Barcelona, 1974.
- La persecución religiosa en España durante la Segunda República, 1931–1939 Vicente Cárcel Ortí. Ediciones Rialp, 1990 – 404 páginas
- Checas de Barcelona: el terror y la represión estalinista en Catalunya, de César Alcalá Giménez. Edit. Belacqua de ediciones y publicaciones, S.L. ISBN 978-84-96326-44-6. Barcelona, 2005.
