= Margency =

- Commune
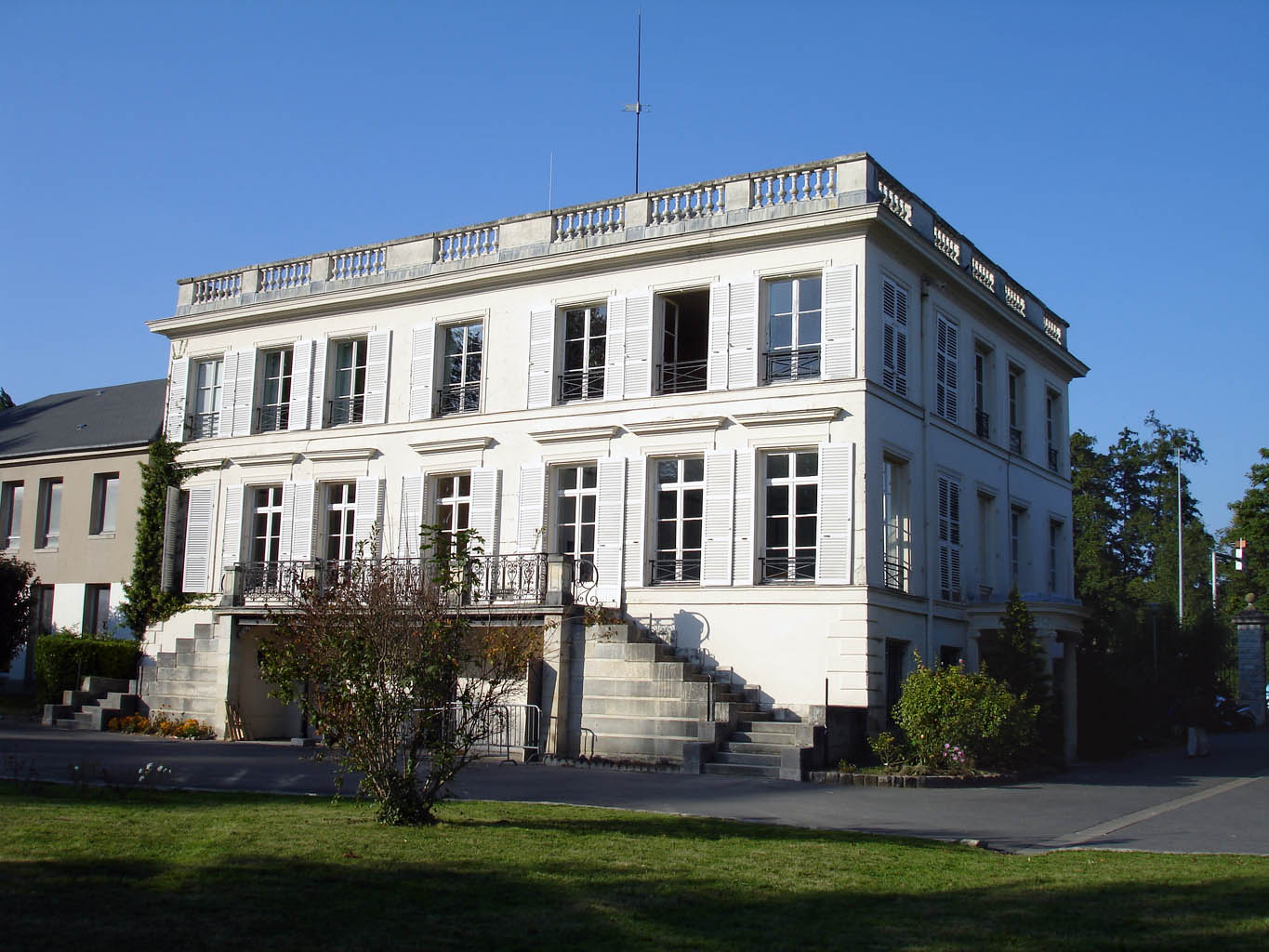
- Château de Bury

- Coat of arms
- Location of Margency
- Location within France Location within Île-de-France (region)
- Coordinates: 49°00′09″N 2°17′25″E
- Country: France
- Region: Île-de-France
- Department: Val-d'Oise
- Arrondissement: Sarcelles
- Canton: Montmorency
- Intercommunality: CA Plaine Vallée

Government
  - Mayor (2020–2026): Thierry Brun
- Area^{1}: 0.72 km^{2} (0.28 sq mi)
- Highest elevation: 125 m (410 ft)
- Lowest elevation: 55 m (180 ft)
- Population (2023): 3,012
  - Density: 4,200/km^{2} (11,000/sq mi)
- Time zone: UTC+01:00 (CET)
  - Summer (DST): UTC+02:00 (CEST)
- INSEE/Postal code: 95369 /95580
- ^{1} French Land Register data, which excludes lakes, ponds, glaciers > 1 km^{2} (0.386 sq mi or 247 acres) and river estuaries.

Margency (French pronunciation: [maʁʒɑ̃si]) is a commune in the Val-d'Oise department and Île-de-France region of France.

The composer Victor Serventi died in Margency on 16 March 2000.

== Population ==
Historical population
Year	Pop.	±% p.a.
1968	860	—
1975	1,468	+7.94%
1982	2,451	+7.60%
1990	2,745	+1.43%
1999	2,587	−0.66%
2007	2,857	+1.25%
2012	2,893	+0.25%
2017	2,887	−0.04%
2023	3,012	+0.71%
Source: INSEE

== See also ==
- Communes of the Val-d'Oise department
