= Johanna Joseph =

French basketball player (born 1992)

Johanna Joseph (born January 21, 1992, in Enghien-les-Bains) is a French basketball player who plays for club Flammes Carolo Basket Ardennes of the Ligue Féminine de Basketball.
