= Canton of Montmorency =

Coordinates: 48.99°N 2.32°E

The canton of Montmorency is an administrative division of the Val-d'Oise department, Île-de-France region, northern France. Its borders were modified at the French canton reorganisation which came into effect in March 2015. Its seat is in Montmorency.

It consists of the following communes:

1. Andilly
2. Enghien-les-Bains
3. Margency
4. Montlignon
5. Montmorency
6. Soisy-sous-Montmorency
