= Champ de courses d'Enghien station =

French railway station

Champ de courses d'Enghien Commune de Soisy-sous-Montmorency
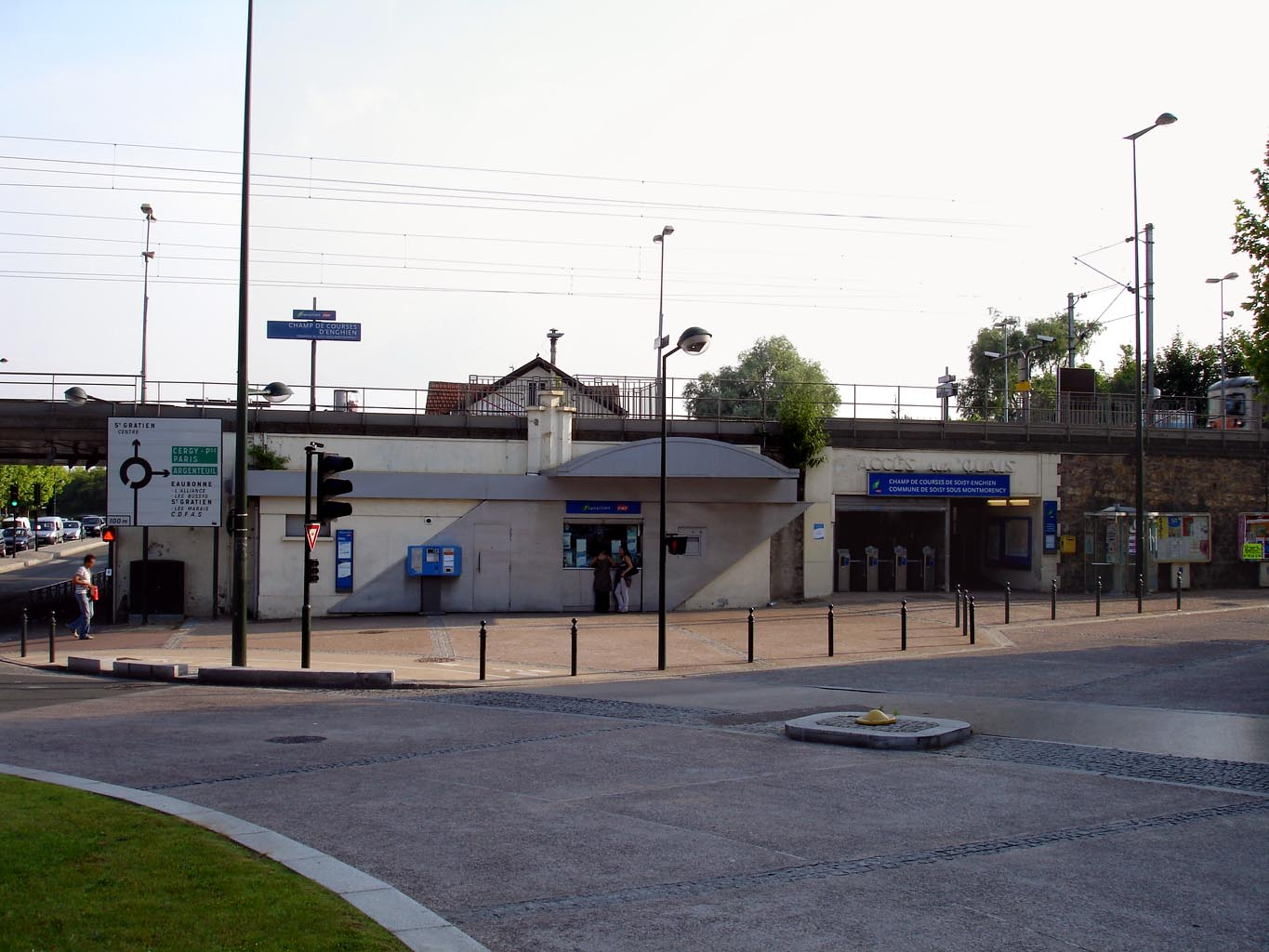

General information
- Location: Soisy-sous-Montmorency, France
- Coordinates: 48°58′47″N 2°17′30″E
- Owner: SNCF
- Line: Saint-Denis–Dieppe railway
- Platforms: 2 platforms
- Tracks: 2 tracks

Other information
- Station code: 87276030

History
- Opened: 1 May 1880

Passengers
- 2024: 2,175,046

Services
Preceding station	Transilien	Following station
Enghien-les-Bains towards Paris-Nord	Line H	Ermont–Eaubonne towards Pontoise or Persan–Beaumont
Location

Champ de courses d'Enghien is a railway station in the commune of Soisy-sous-Montmorency (Val-d'Oise department), France. The station is served by Transilien H trains, on the lines from Paris to Persan-Beaumont and Pontoise. The annual number of passengers was 2,175,046 in 2024. The station has two free parking sections with 433 spaces in total. The station is served every 15 minutes. It takes 15 to 19 minutes to reach Paris.

== History ==
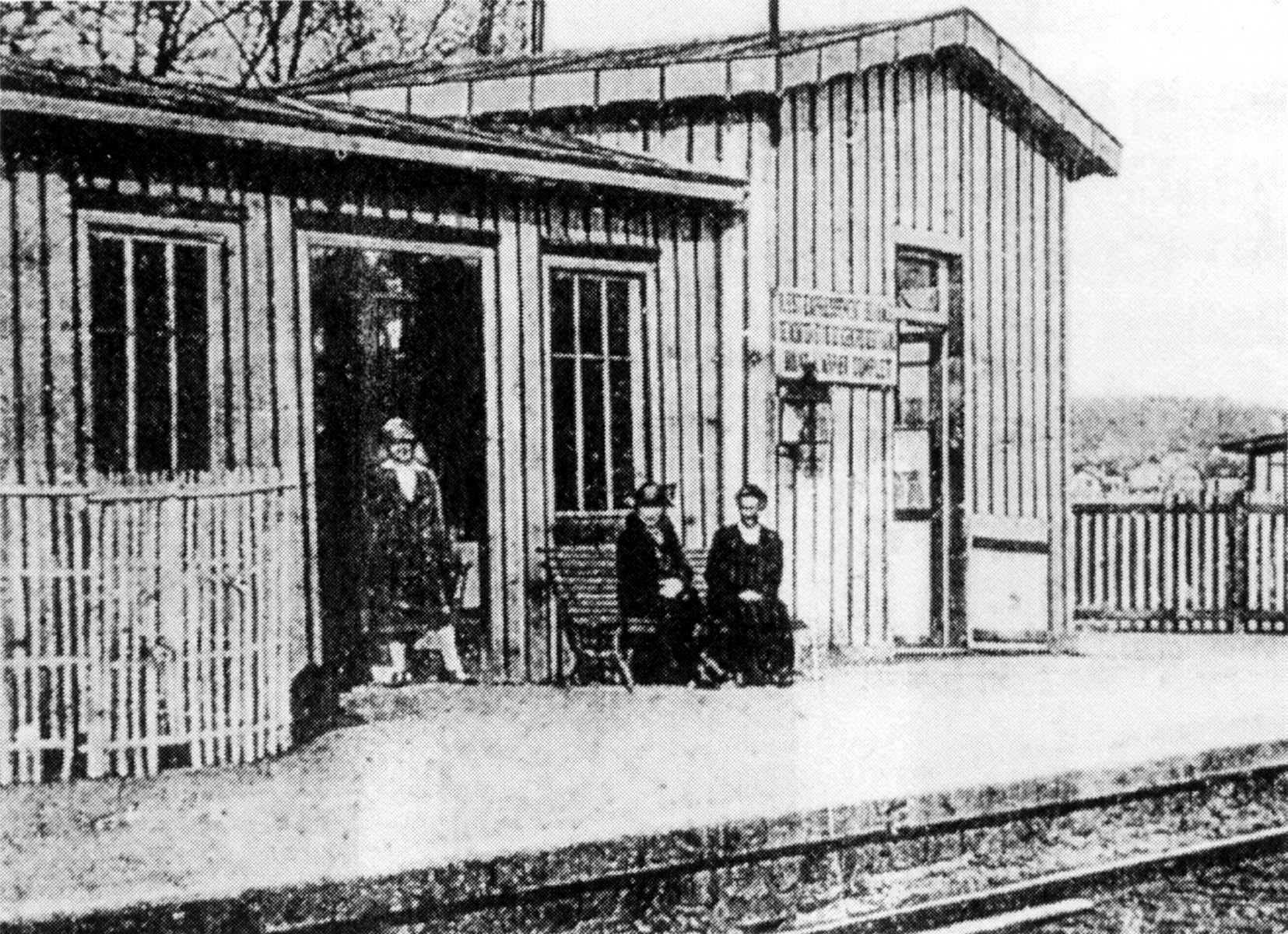
The Champ de courses d'Enghien station at the beginning of the 20th century.

Champ de courses d'Enghien is located on the original Paris – Lille line, opened on 20 June 1846 by Compagnie des chemins de fer du Nord (Nord Railway Company). This line passed along the Montmorency Valley (Ermont-Eaubonne), and headed towards the Northeast at Saint-Ouen-l'Aumône, continuing through the Oise valley. In 1859, a more direct line along Chantilly was opened. The line Paris – Pontoise was electrified in 1969.

== See also ==
- List of SNCF stations in Île-de-France
