= Montmorency Township =

Montmorency Township may refer to the following places in the United States:

- Montmorency Township, Whiteside County, Illinois
- Montmorency Township, Michigan

== See also ==
- Montmorency (disambiguation)
