= Nathaniel Virayie =

French footballer (born 1991)

Personal information
- Full name: Nathaniel Alexis Virayie
- Date of birth: January 6, 1991 (age 35)
- Place of birth: Enghien-les-Bains, France
- Position: Midfielder

Team information
- Current team: AJ Auxerre
- Number: 29

Youth career
- 2004–2007: Sedan

Senior career*
Years	Team	Apps	(Gls)
2007–2008	Sedan		
2008	Pescara Calcio	5	(0)
2009	Entente SSG	9	(0)
2009–2010	AJ Auxerre		

International career
2005–2007	France U-16	19	(5)
2007–2009	France U-18	6	(2)
- * Club domestic league appearances and goals

Nathaniel Alexis Virayie (born January 6, 1991, in Enghien-les-Bains, Val-d'Oise) is a French professional footballer currently playing for Ligue 1 team AJ Auxerre.

== Career ==
Virayie began his career with CS Sedan Ardennes and joined in summer 2008 to Pescara Calcio. After just a half year in the Serie C with Pescara Calcio turned back to France to sign with Entente SSG. Virayie turned after another half year in summer 2009 from Championnat National side Sannois Saint-Gratien to the Ligue 1 club AJ Auxerre, formerly had a short trial period in Greece with Panathinaikos F.C. on 6 June 2009.
