= Montlignon =

- Commune
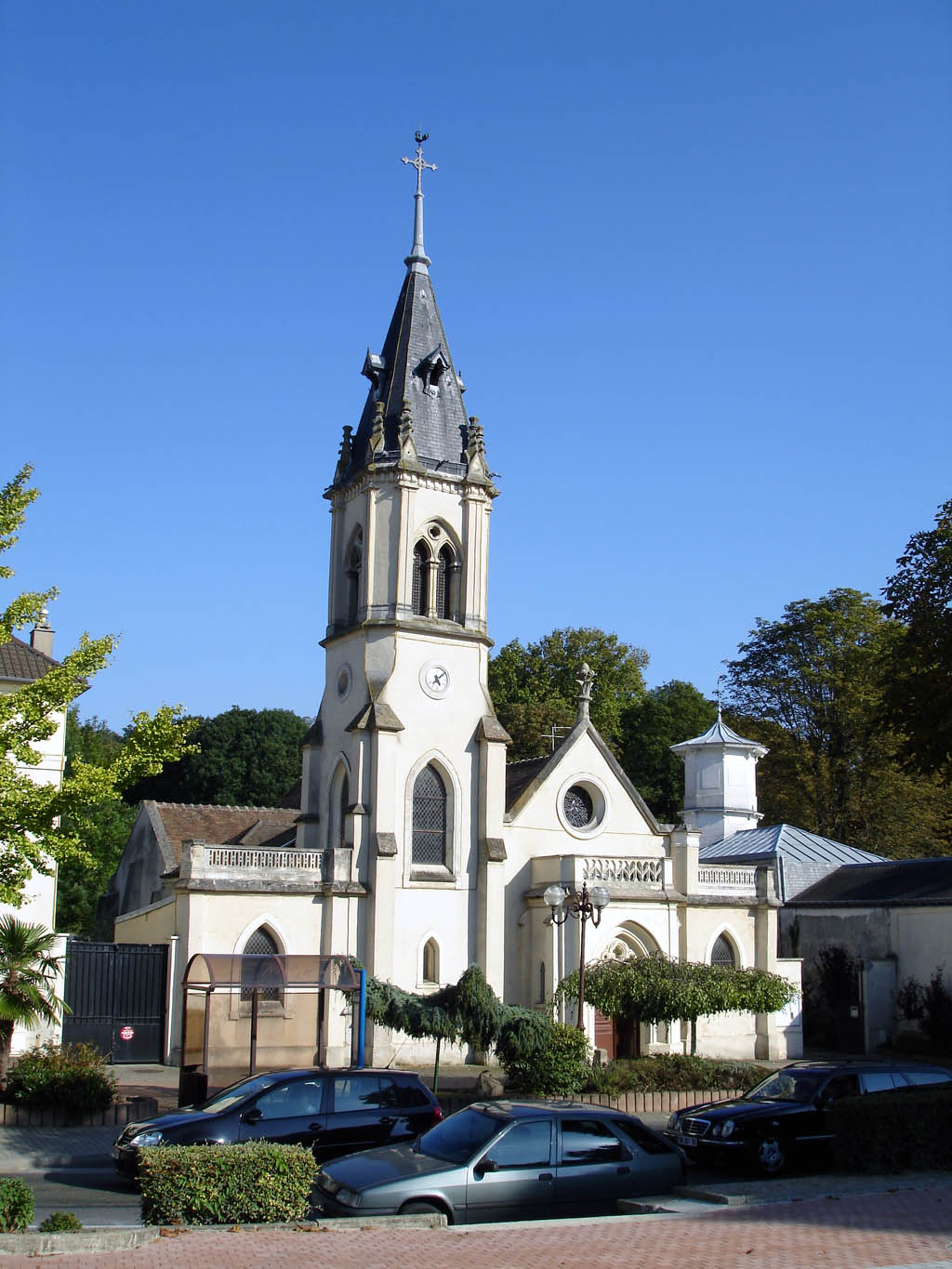
- The church of Saint-André, in Montlignon

- Coat of arms
- Location of Montlignon
- Location within France Location within Île-de-France (region)
- Coordinates: 49°00′37″N 2°17′05″E
- Country: France
- Region: Île-de-France
- Department: Val-d'Oise
- Arrondissement: Sarcelles
- Canton: Montmorency
- Intercommunality: CA Plaine Vallée

Government
  - Mayor (2020–2026): Alain Goujon
- Area^{1}: 2.84 km^{2} (1.10 sq mi)
- Highest elevation: 185 m (607 ft)
- Lowest elevation: 62 m (203 ft)
- Population (2023): 3,038
  - Density: 1,070/km^{2} (2,770/sq mi)
- Time zone: UTC+01:00 (CET)
  - Summer (DST): UTC+02:00 (CEST)
- INSEE/Postal code: 95426 /95680
- ^{1} French Land Register data, which excludes lakes, ponds, glaciers > 1 km^{2} (0.386 sq mi or 247 acres) and river estuaries.

Montlignon (French pronunciation: [mɔ̃liɲɔ̃]) is a commune in the Val-d'Oise department in Île-de-France in northern France.

== Toponymy ==
The name Montlignon likely derives from the Latin Molignum, meaning 'small mill', referring to the watermills which were present in the area.

== Population ==
Historical population
Year	Pop.	±% p.a.
1968	1,759	—
1975	2,041	+2.15%
1982	2,205	+1.11%
1990	2,505	+1.61%
1999	2,427	−0.35%
2007	2,516	+0.45%
2012	2,653	+1.07%
2017	2,978	+2.34%
2023	3,038	+0.33%
Source: INSEE

== See also ==
- Communes of the Val-d'Oise department
