= Lac d'Enghien =

Lake in Val-d'Oise, France

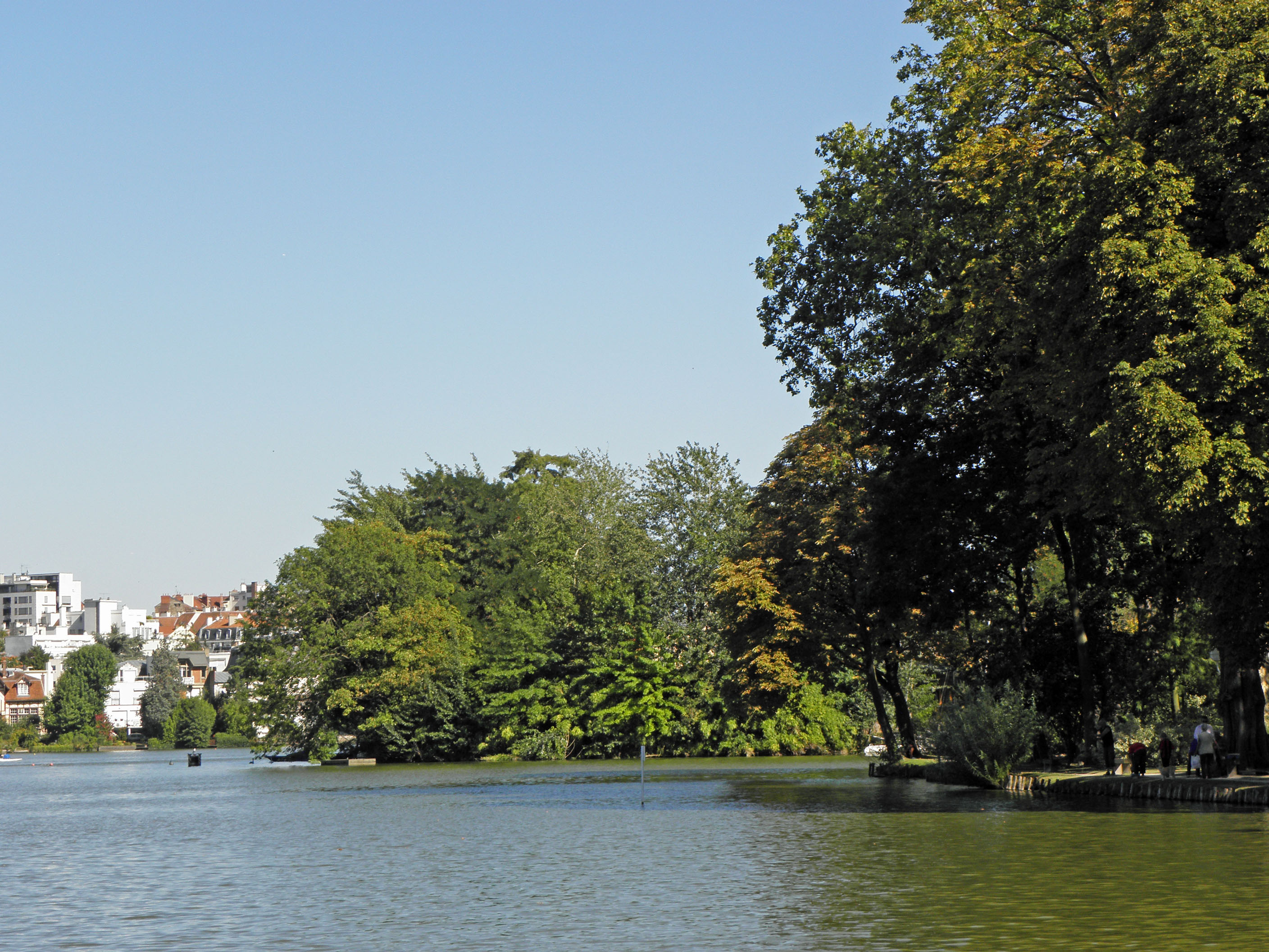
- The Lac d'Enghien

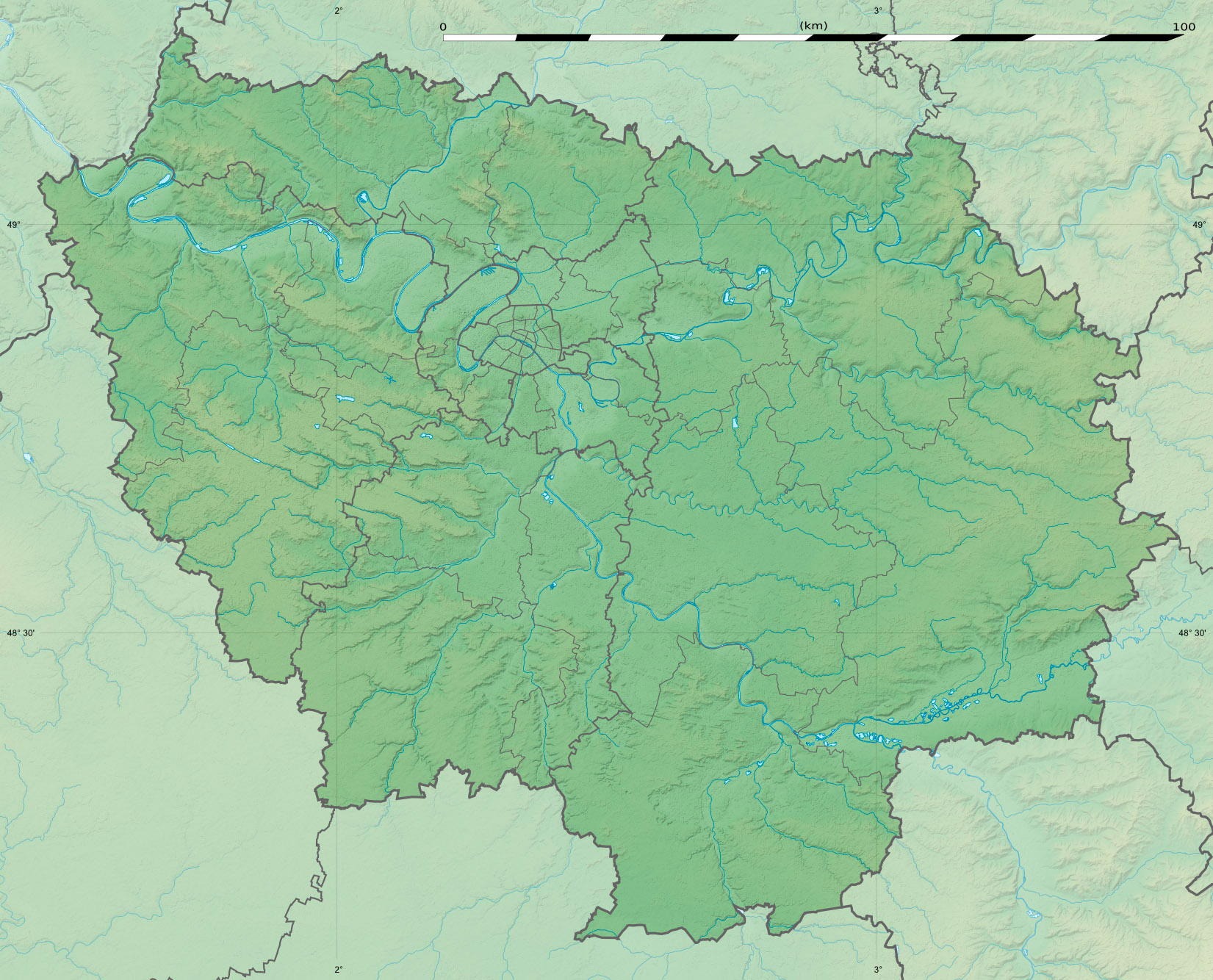
- Location within Île-de-France (region)
- Location: Enghien-les-Bains
- Coordinates: 48°58′15″N 02°18′00″E
- Primary outflows: Ru d'Enghien
- Catchment area: 70.38 km^{2} (27.17 sq mi)
- Basin countries: France
- Max. length: 930 m (3,050 ft)
- Max. width: 350 m (1,150 ft)
- Surface area: 43 ha (110 acres)
- Average depth: 1.8 m (5 ft 11 in)
- Max. depth: 2.55 m (8 ft 4 in)
- Surface elevation: 43 m (141 ft)
- Islands: 2

The Lac d'Enghien (French pronunciation: [lak dɑ̃ɡɛ̃]; Lake of Enghien) is a freshwater artificial lake in the Parisian suburb of Enghien-les-Bains, France.

== Geography ==
Lac d'Enghien is in the Île-de-France region, approximately seven miles north of Paris. Administratively it belongs to the commune of Enghien-les-Bains in the department of Val-d'Oise. It is the department's largest body of water.

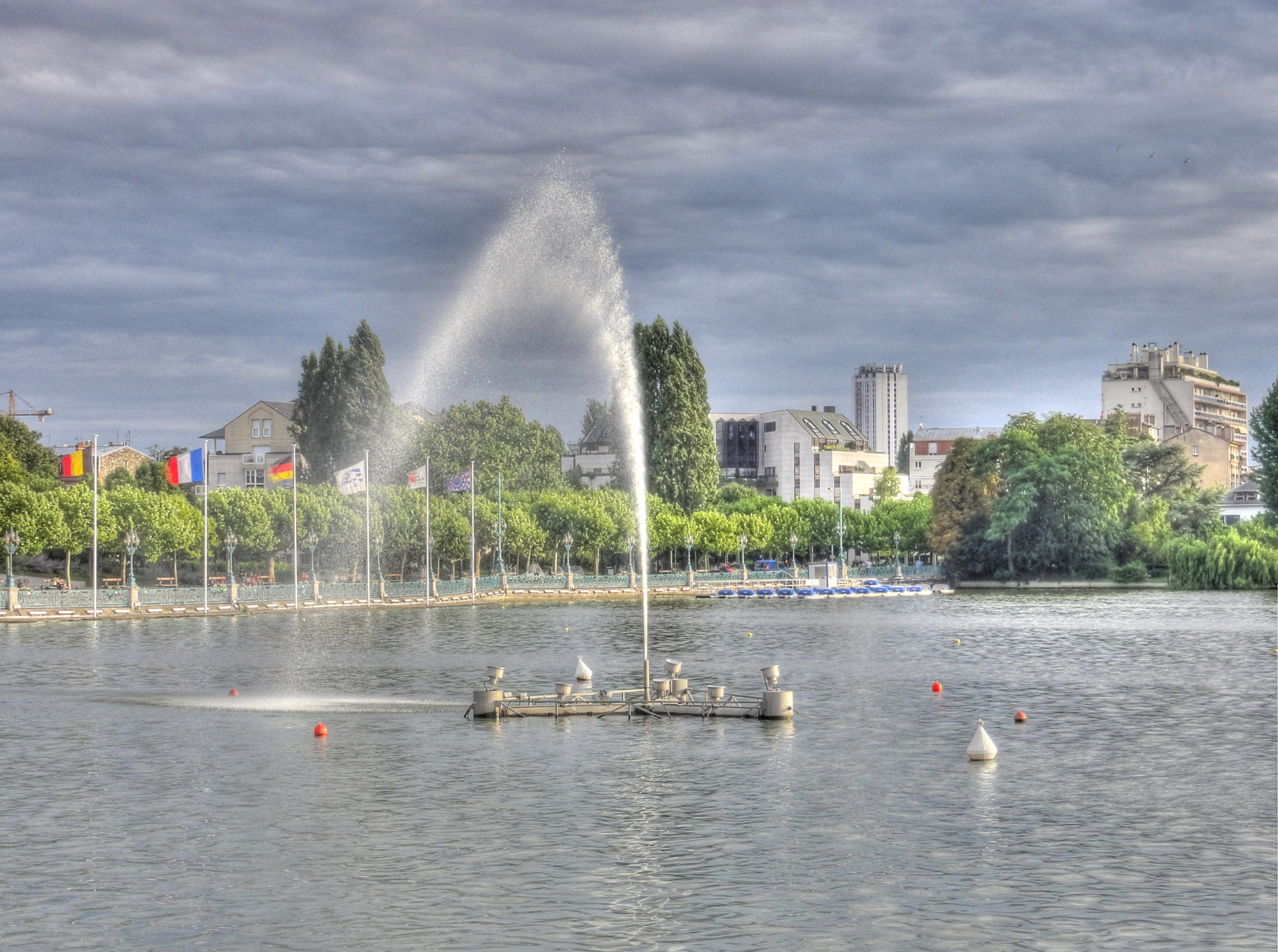
Fountain and pier at Lac d'Enghien

== Features ==
The lake is roughly 350 metres (1,150 ft) wide and 930 metres (3,050 ft) long, with a circumference of 3.09 kilometres (1.92 mi) and a total surface area of 43 hectares (110 acres). The lake water is replenished by several small streams: the Corbon, Haras, d'Ermont, and d'Andilly, all of them under 8 kilometres (5.0 mi) long .

== See also ==
- Montmorency, Val-d'Oise
