= Montmorency, Val-d'Oise =

Montmorency
- Commune
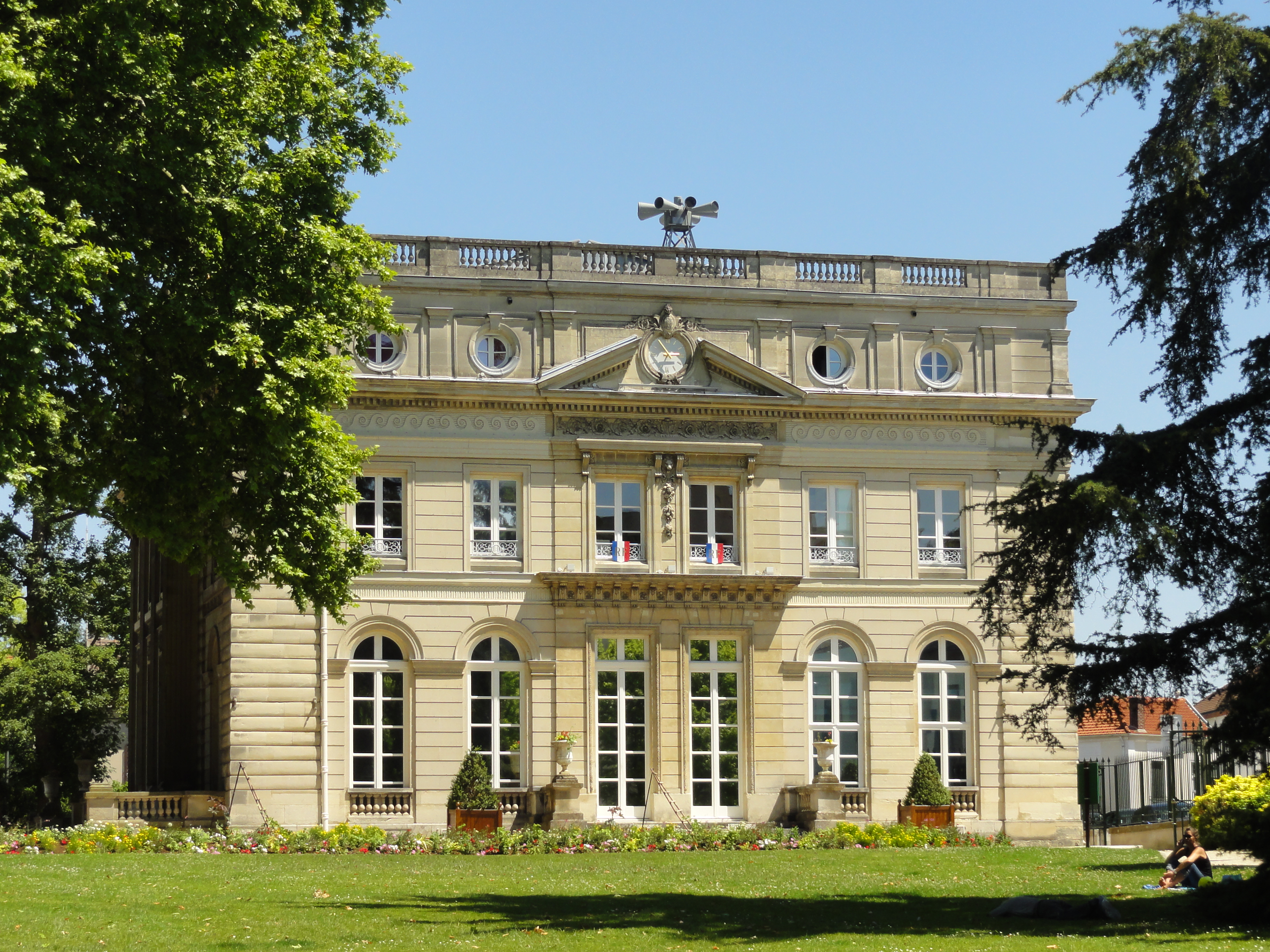
- The Hôtel de Ville

- Coat of arms

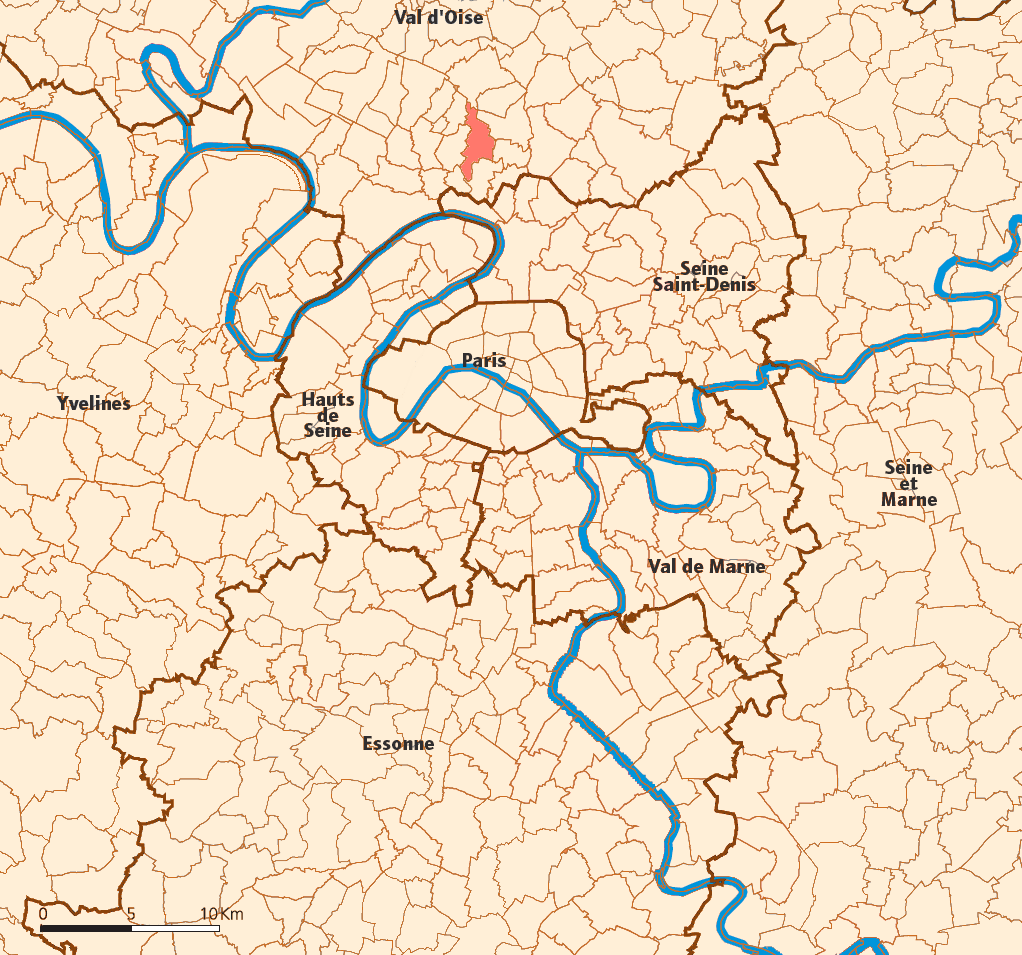
- Location (in red) within Paris inner and outer suburbs
- Location of Montmorency
- Location within France Location within Île-de-France (region)
- Coordinates: 48°59′26″N 2°19′22″E
- Country: France
- Region: Île-de-France
- Department: Val-d'Oise
- Arrondissement: Sarcelles
- Canton: Montmorency
- Intercommunality: CA Plaine Vallée

Government
  - Mayor (2020–2026): Maxime Thory
- Area^{1}: 5.37 km^{2} (2.07 sq mi)
- Population (2023): 21,763
  - Density: 4,050/km^{2} (10,500/sq mi)
- Demonym: Montmorencéens
- Time zone: UTC+01:00 (CET)
  - Summer (DST): UTC+02:00 (CEST)
- INSEE/Postal code: 95428 /95160
- Website: www.ville-montmorency.fr
- ^{1} French Land Register data, which excludes lakes, ponds, glaciers > 1 km^{2} (0.386 sq mi or 247 acres) and river estuaries.

Montmorency (French pronunciation: [mɔ̃mɔʁɑ̃si]) is a commune in the Val-d'Oise department, in the northern outer suburbs of Paris, France. It is located 15.3 km (9.5 mi) from the centre of Paris.

Montmorency was the fief of the Montmorency family, one of the oldest and most distinguished families of the French nobility. It is now a wealthy suburb of Paris.

== Name ==
The name Montmorency was recorded for the first time in Medieval Latin as Mons Maurentiacus (attested in 993). Mons Maurentiacus, literally "Mount Maurentiacus", was the name given to the promontory over which a castle was built in the Early Middle Ages. Maurentiacus, the name of the area surrounding the promontory, meant "estate of Maurentius", probably a Gallo-Roman landowner.

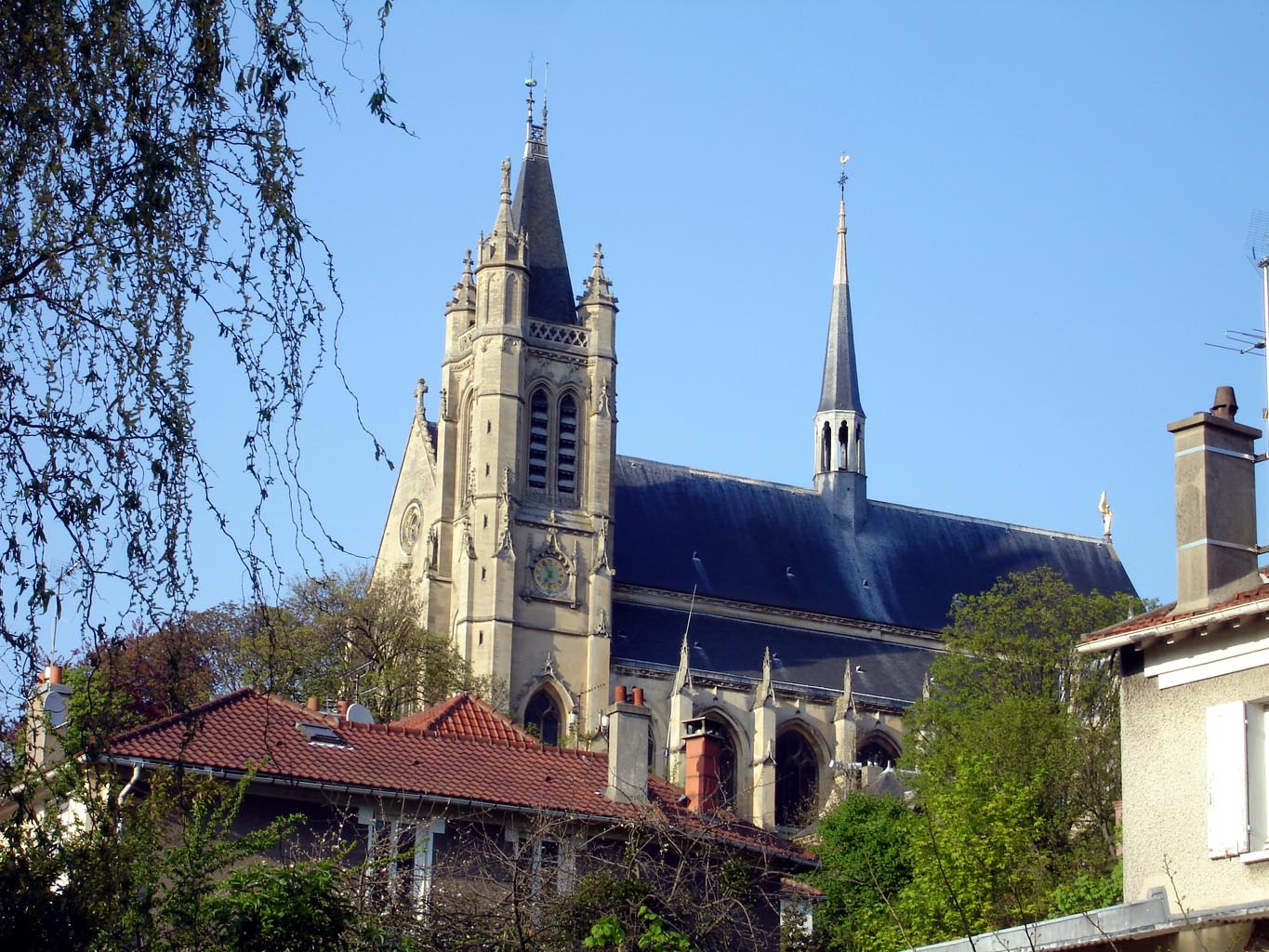
16th-century St Martin Collegiate Church

In 1689 Montmorency was officially renamed Enghien, but the village on the slopes of the promontory was still referred to as "Montmorency" by most people. During the French Revolution, at the creation of French communes in 1790, the newly born commune was named Montmorency. Three years later in 1793, at the peak of the French Revolution, the name of the commune, which was probably thought of as too reminiscent of the overthrown Ancien Régime, was changed into Émile, in honor of French philosopher and writer Jean-Jacques Rousseau who had composed his educational treaty Émile a few decades earlier while in residence at Montmorency.

In 1813 the commune was renamed Montmorency. In 1815, at the Restoration of monarchy, the commune was renamed Enghien. Throughout these troubled years, however, the village was always referred to as "Montmorency" by the locals, regardless of what the official name was in all its changes.

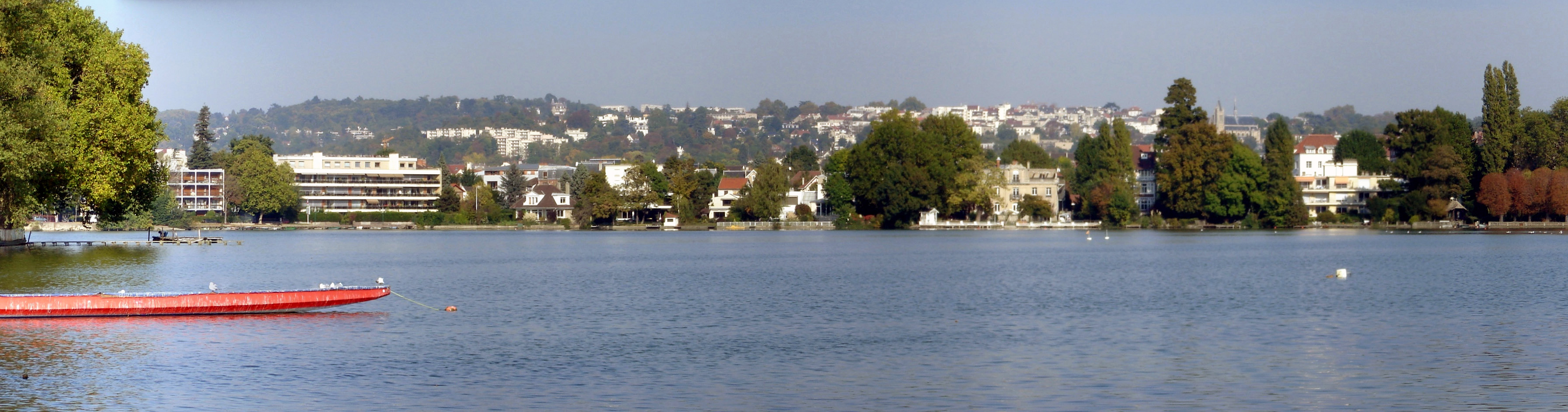
The Lac d'Enghien with a view of Montmorency

The name "Enghien", on the other hand, was used for the lake and marshland in the valley beneath Montmorency, an area that was withdrawn from the jurisdiction of the commune of Montmorency/Enghien in 1790, and was divided between the jurisdictions of several neighboring communes. In other words, the place called "Enghien" was not located within the commune of Enghien.

This confusing situation was ended on 27 November 1832, when the commune of Enghien was definitely renamed Montmorency. In 1850, the area of Enghien, which had developed as a spa resort, was incorporated as a commune (named Enghien-les-Bains) by detaching its territory from the territory of four communes neighboring Montmorency. The commune of Montmorency did not lose territory and as such was not affected by the incorporation of the commune of Enghien-les-Bains.

== History ==
Montmorency was the fief of the Montmorency family, one of the oldest and most distinguished families of the French nobility, who owed their name to the location of their ancestral castle on the promontory of Montmorency. The castle of Montmorency was destroyed by the English during the Hundred Years' War and was not rebuilt. After the Hundred Years' War, the Montmorency moved their residence to the Château d'Écouen in Écouen, 5.6 km (3.5 mi) to the northeast of Montmorency.

In 1632 the last Montmorency, Henri II de Montmorency, was executed for treason in Toulouse and the duchy of Montmorency was inherited by the Princes of Condé, a cadet branch of the French royal family who, like the Montmorency, did not reside in Montmorency, choosing instead the Château de Chantilly as their residence. In 1689 King Louis XIV allowed the duchy of Montmorency to be renamed duchy of Enghien, in memory of the duchy of Enghien (modern-day Belgium) which the Princes of Condé had lost in 1569 at the death of Louis I de Bourbon, Prince de Condé. Montmorency/Enghien was the fief of the Princes of Condé until the French Revolution.

The art collector Pierre Crozat had a country retreat here in the first half of the 18th century, the fashionable Château de Montmorency, which was at the centre of social gatherings. It contained a chapel decorated in 1715-16 by Pierre Le Gros the Younger and paintings by Charles de La Fosse. The building was demolished in 1817.

The Hôtel de Ville was built as a private residence and completed in 1791.

In addition, the Montmorency cherry, a popular sour cherry variety, derives its name from the town.

== Population ==
Historical population

Year	Pop.	±% p.a.
1793	1,870	—
1800	1,697	−1.38%
1806	1,683	−0.14%
1821	1,573	−0.45%
1831	1,789	+1.30%
1836	1,870	+0.89%
1841	1,930	+0.63%
1846	2,051	+1.22%
1851	2,144	+0.89%
1856	2,359	+1.93%
1861	2,613	+2.07%
1866	3,126	+3.65%
1872	3,494	+1.87%
1876	4,088	+4.00%
1881	4,295	+0.99%
1886	4,894	+2.65%
1891	4,577	−1.33%
1896	4,966	+1.64%
1901	5,419	+1.76%

Year	Pop.	±% p.a.
1906	5,997	+2.05%
1911	7,093	+3.41%
1921	8,490	+1.81%
1926	9,977	+3.28%
1931	10,891	+1.77%
1936	10,535	−0.66%
1946	11,126	+0.55%
1954	14,094	+3.00%
1962	16,369	+1.89%
1968	18,691	+2.24%
1975	20,860	+1.58%
1982	20,798	−0.04%
1990	20,920	+0.07%
1999	20,599	−0.17%
2007	21,381	+0.47%
2012	20,842	−0.51%
2017	21,461	+0.59%
2023	21,763	+0.23%

Source: EHESS and INSEE (1968–2023)

== Transport ==
The closest station to Montmorency is Enghien-les-Bains station on the Transilien Paris-Nord suburban rail line and it takes 13 minutes from Paris Gare du Nord to get there. This station is located in the neighboring commune of Enghien-les-Bains, 2.1 km (1.3 mi) from the town center of Montmorency. From there, one can take the buses 15M or 13 to get into the city centre.

== Education ==
Primary schools:

- Three combined preschools (maternelles) and elementary schools: Pasteur, La Fontaine, and Sablons preschool/Jules Ferry elementary
- Preschool only: Jules Ferry preschool and Ferdinand Buisson preschool
- Elementary school only: Ferdinand Buisson elementary

Secondary schools:

- Junior high schools: Charles-Le-Brun and Pierre-de-Ronsard
- Senior high schools: Lycée d'enseignement général Jean-Jacques Rousseau and Lycée professionnel Turgot

== Personalities ==
- Marie-Hélène Arnaud, model and actress
- Jean Bertheroy, writer
- Heinrich Heine, German poet, writer and literary critic
- Christian Nade, footballer
- Jean-Jacques Rousseau, philosopher, writer, and composer
- Emilie Sonvico, boxer
- Richard Wagner, composer, theatre director, polemicist, and conductor

== See also ==
- Cimetière des Champeaux de Montmorency
- Communes of the Val-d'Oise department
