= Mathieu de Montmorency (disambiguation) =

Mathieu de Montmorency (1767–1826) was a French nobleman and statesman during the French Revolution and the Bourbon Restoration.

It may also refer to:

- Matthew I of Montmorency (died 1160)
- Matthew II of Montmorency (died 1230)
- Matthew III of Montmorency (died 1270)
- Matthew IV of Montmorency (died 1305)

== See also ==
- House of Montmorency
