= House of Montmorency =

French noble family

Montmorency
- Noble house
- Coat of arms of the House of Montmorency
- Country: Kingdom of France
- Founded: c. 997
- Founder: Bouchard I of Montmorency
- Motto: Dieu ayde le premier baron chrestien (God help the first Christian baron)
- Cadet branches: House of Laval

The House of Montmorency (pronounced [mɔ̃.mɔ.ʁɑ̃.si]) was one of the oldest and most distinguished noble families in France.

== Origins ==
The family name Montmorency derived from their castle in the pays de France, recorded in Latin as Mons Maurentiacus, in 993. Maurentiacus, the name of the area surrounding the castle, meant "estate of Maurentius", probably a Gallo-Roman landowner. The village that grew up in the vicinity of the castle was also known as Montmorency, and is eponymous of the modern commune of Montmorency, Val-d'Oise département, in the immediate neighborhood of Enghien-les-Bains and Saint-Denis, about 15 km (9 mi) northwest of Paris.

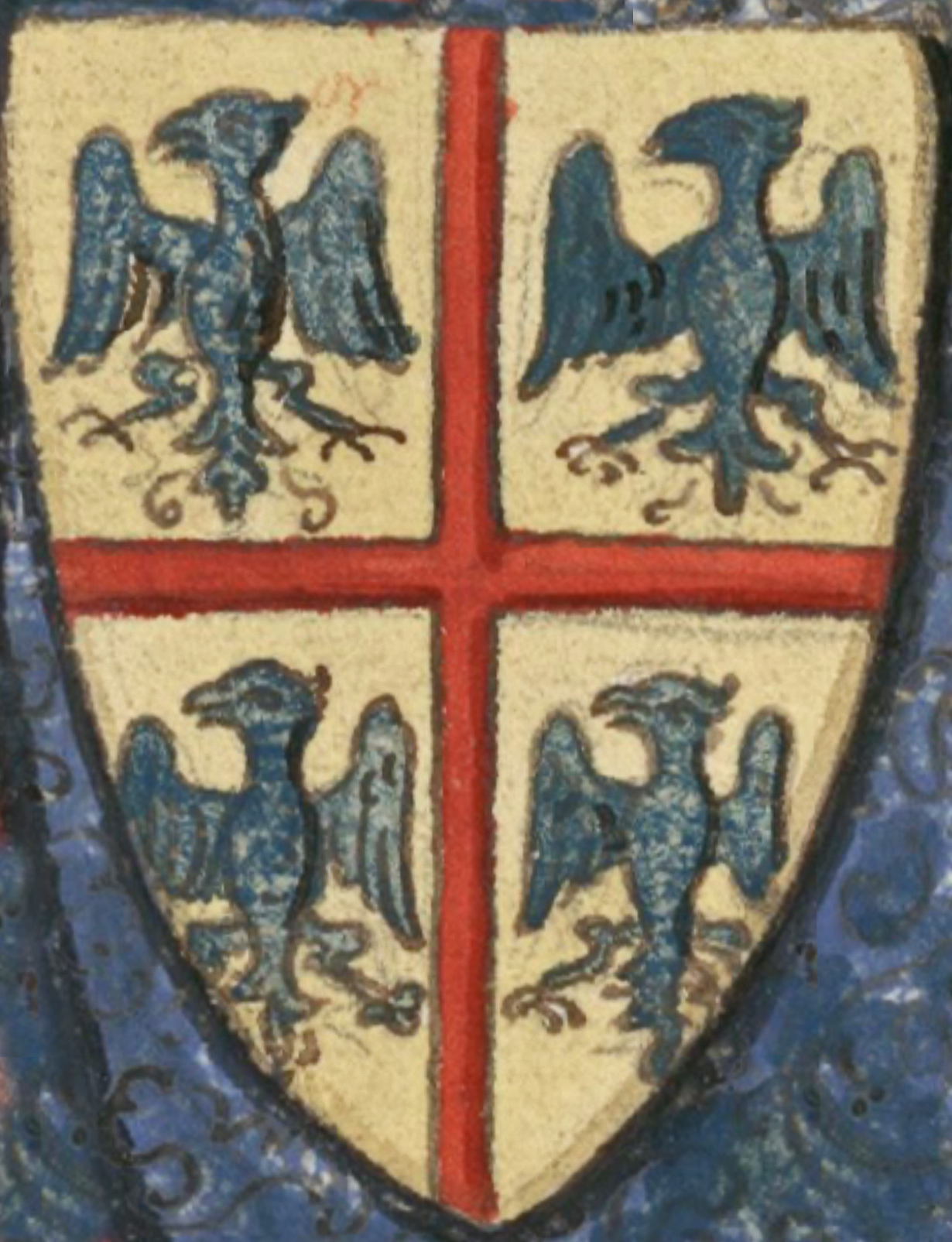
Armes de Montmorency (from 13th century depiction at Notre-Dame de Chartres)

== History ==
The family, since its first appearance in history in the person of Bouchard I of Montmorency in the 10th century, has furnished six constables and twelve marshals of France, several admirals and cardinals, numerous grand officers of the Crown and grand masters of various knightly orders. Henry IV of France once said, that if ever the House of Bourbon should fail (i.e., become extinct), no European family deserved the French crown more than the House of Montmorency. Bouchard I's son Thibaud of Montmorency was the ancestor of the lords of Montlhéry.

Matthieu I of Montmorency received in 1138 the post of constable, and died in 1160. His first wife was Aline, a natural daughter of Henry I of England; his second, Adelaide de Maurienne, widow of Louis VI and mother of Louis VII, and according to Duchesne, he shared the regency of France with Suger, during the absence of the latter king on the Second Crusade.

Matthieu II of Montmorency had an important share in the victory of Bouvines (1214). As he captured 12 enemy flags at Bouvines, he was permitted by the king to display 12 eagles on his coat of arms. He was also made constable in 1218. During the reign of Louis VIII he distinguished himself chiefly in the south of France (Niort, La Rochelle, Bordeaux). On the accession of Louis IX, he was one of the chief supports of the queen-regent Blanche of Castile, and was successful in reducing all vassals to obedience. He died in 1230.

His younger son, Guy, in right of his mother, became head of the House of Laval. Canada's oldest French-language university, Université Laval, was named after François de Montmorency-Laval, first bishop of New France and founder of the Quebec Seminary, from while Université Laval emerged.

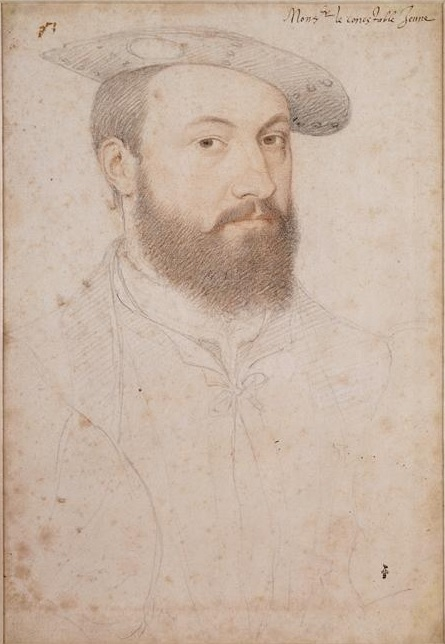
Anne de Montmorency, 1530, by Jean Clouet

Anne de Montmorency, so named, it is said, after his godmother Anne of Brittany, was the first to attain the ducal title (1551).

His eldest son, François de Montmorency (1530–1579), was married to Diane, natural daughter of Henry II.

Another son, Henri I de Montmorency (1534–1614), who became duc de Montmorency on his brother's death in 1579, had been governor of Languedoc since 1563. As a leader of the party called the Politiques he took a prominent part in the French Wars of Religion. In 1593 he was made constable, but Henry IV showed some anxiety to keep him away from Languedoc, which he ruled like a sovereign prince.

Henri II de Montmorency (1595 – October 30, 1632), son of Duke Henri I, succeeded to the title in 1614, having previously been made Grand Admiral. He also was governor of Languedoc. In 1625 he defeated the French Protestant fleet under Soubise, and seized the islands of Ré and Oléron, but the jealousy of Richelieu deprived him of the means of following up these advantages. In 1628–1629 he was allowed to command against the Duke of Rohan in Languedoc; in 1630 he defeated the Piedmontese, and captured Carlo Doria, at Avigliana, and took Saluzzo.

In the same year he was created marshal. In 1632 he joined the party of Gaston, duke of Orleans, and placed himself at the head of the rebel army, which was defeated by Marshal Henri de Schomberg at Castelnaudary (September 1, 1632); severely wounded, he fell into the enemy's hands and, abandoned by Gaston, was executed as a traitor at Toulouse on October 30. The ducal title passed to his sister Charlotte-Marguerite, princess of Condé.

From the barons de Fosseux, a branch of the Montmorency family established in Brabant in the 15th century, sprang the seigneurs de Bouteville, among whom was the duellist François de Montmorency-Bouteville, who was beheaded in 1627. His son, François Henri, marshal of France, became Duke of Piney-Luxemburg by his marriage with Madeleine de Clermont, daughter of Marguerite Charlotte de Luxemburg, Duchesse de Piney.

Charles François Frédéric de Montmorency-Luxembourg, son of the marshal, was created Duc de Beaufort in 1688 and Duke of Montmorency in 1689.

In 1767 the title of Duke of Beaufort-Montmorency passed by marriage to another branch of the Montmorency-Fosseux. This branch becoming extinct in 1862, the title was taken by the Duc de Valencay, who belonged to the Talleyrand-Périgord family and married one of the two heiresses of this branch (1864). There were many other branches of the Montmorency family, among others that of the seigneurs of Laval.

In the 19th century the Irish Morres family highlighted a claim to descent from the Montmorency family. Morres descendants persisted in asserting the connection, obtaining a Royal license to change their name, despite objections expressed in the 1860s by undisputed descendants of the Montmorency family in France.

== List of lords of Montmorency ==
The lords of Montmorency were:

- Bouchard I of Montmorency (died c. 980)
- Bouchard II of Montmorency (died 1020)
- Bouchard III of Montmorency
- Hervé of Montmorency (died c. 1094), Grand Butler of France
- Bouchard IV of Montmorency (died 1131/2 in Jerusalem), lord of Montmorency, Marly, Feuillarde, Saint-Brice, Épinay and Hérouville
- Matthieu I of Montmorency (died 1160), Grand Constable of France, lord of Montmorency, Écouen, Marly, Conflans and Attichy
- Bouchard V of Montmorency (died 1189)
- Matthieu II of Montmorency (died 1230), Grand Constable of France
- Bouchard VI of Montmorency (died 1243)
- Matthieu III of Montmorency (died 1270)
- Matthieu IV of Montmorency (died 1305)
- Jean I of Montmorency (died 1325)
- Charles of Montmorency (died 1381)
- Jacques of Montmorency (died 1414)
- Jean II of Montmorency (died 1477)
- Guillaume of Montmorency (died 1531)
- Anne of Montmorency (died 1567), Marshal and Constable of France, created Duke of Montmorency in 1551.
- François de Montmorency (died 1579), 2nd Duke of Montmorency, Marshal of France.
- Henri I of Montmorency (died 1614), 3rd Duke of Montmorency, Constable of France.
- Henri II of Montmorency (died 1632), 4th Duke of Montmorency
- Charlotte Marguerite de Montmorency (died 1650), sister of the 4th duke. She and her husband Henri II de Bourbon were newly created first duke and duchess of Montmorency.
- Louis II de Bourbon (died 1686), 2nd Duke of Montmorency (2nd creation)
- Henri III de Bourbon (died 1709) 3rd Duke of Montmorency (2nd creation)

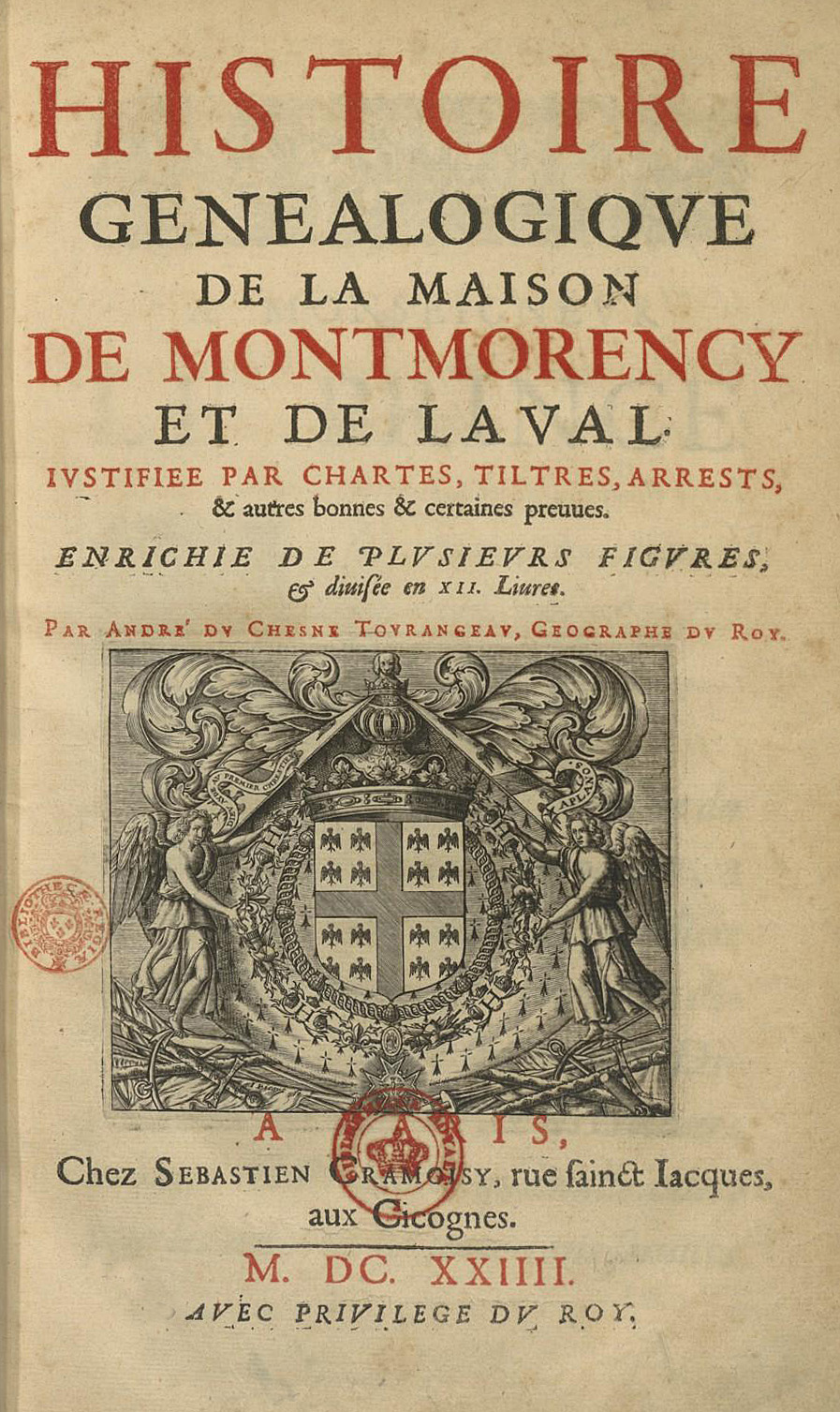
Histoire généalogique de la maison de Montmorency et de Laval; par André Du Chesne (1624)

In 1689, the title of Duke of Montmorency was merged with that of Duke of Enghien. Louis, Prince of Condé (1668–1710) carried the title of Duke of Montmorency-Enghien. The title was extinct in 1830 with the House of Bourbon-Condé.

== See also ==
- Lords of Robecque
