= Hervé de Montmorency =

Hervé de Montmorency may refer to:

- Hervé of Montmorency (d. 1096), a French noble
- Hervey de Montmorency (fl. 1169), an Anglo-Norman adventurer
- Hervey de Montmorency, 4th Viscount Mountmorres (1796–1872), an Irish dean
