= Bouchard III of Montmorency =

French noble (died 1031)

Bouchard III (died 1031) was a French noble, lord of Montmorency, Écouen, Marly, Feullarde, and Château-Basset, and a member of the House of Montmorency.

== Biography ==
Bouchard was the son of Bouchard II of Montmorency (d. 1020) and Idelinde de Basset (981–1012).

He appeared at the court of King Robert II of France among the grandees of his suite around 1022. Until 1032, the year of the King's death, he appears in many charters. Henry I succeeded his father and Bouchard III is believed to have passed away in that year

== Issue ==
Bouchard III had four sons and one daughter by an unknown wife:

- Thibaud, lord of Montmorency on the death of his father, of Écouen, and Constable of France;
- Hervé, lord of Marly and Deuil, then of Montmorency, and Grand Bouteiller of France;
- Geoffroi, lord of Gisors;
- Eudes;
- Isabelle, a nun
