= Bouchard IV of Montmorency =

French noble (died after 1124)

Bouchard IV of Montmorency (died after 1124), was a French noble and lord of Montmorency, Écouen, Conflans-Sainte-Honorine, Attichy and Hérouville.

== Biography ==
Bouchard was the son of Hervé of Montmorency the Grand Butler of France, and Agnes.

Bouchard's first marriage was to Agnes, daughter of Count Yves II de Beaumont. As a dowry, he received Conflans-Sainte-Honorine, the first fief in importance of the Bishop of Paris. Because of this, the lords of Montmorency subsequently occupied the first place at the enthronement ceremony of the bishop and received the first rank among his vassals. Since the bishops themselves held the fief of Conflans-Sainte-Honorine from the French crown, the lords of Montmorency began to call themselves the "First Barons of France".

In the mid 1080s, war broke out between Bouchard and his brother-in-law Mathieu I, Count of Beaumont-sur-Oise and heir to Yves II, over the Beaumont inheritance. In 1086, Bouchard burned down the church in Conflans, thus making the conquest of Conflans unappealing to Mathieu I.

In the 1090s, he came into conflict with Adam, abbot of Saint-Denis over the collection of Seigneurial dues. The conflict escalated into a feudal war, and the abbot, who had suffered a defeat, brought a complaint to the King. The case was heard by Philip I at Passy, and the royal court ruled in favor of the abbot. Bouchard did not submit to the verdict and Prince Louis organized a military expedition against him. Having gathered a royal army, joined by troops from Count Simon II de Montfort, Count Robert II of Flanders and Princess Adela of England, Louis marched against Bouchard in 1101, ravaged his lands, and besieged him in the castle of Montmorency, forcing him to surrender.

Later, Bouchard became a loyal vassal of Louis VI, carrying out various tasks for him. In 1116, at his request, the King approved the donation made by the lord of Montmorency to the Abbey of Cluny.

In 1119, during the war with England, Bouchard unsuccessfully attempted to dissuade Louis VI from giving battle at Brémule. In the battle itself, he fought bravely, was captured during the final, decisive English counterattack, and was taken to Noyen Castle. Unlike the other prisoners, Bouchard and his cousin Hervé de Gisors were almost immediately released by King Henry I, according to Orderic Vitalis, out of respect for their courage and because they were vassals of the King.

The last mention of Bouchard is in 1124, when he issued a charter confirming previous donations made to the priory of Saint-Martin-des-Champs. The calendar of the episcopal Church of Amiens commemorates him on 12 January, and on the basis of an entry in the memorial book of the Abbey of Notre-Dame-du-Val, it has been suggested he died in Jerusalem in 1132.

== Family ==
Bouchard's first marriage (before 1086) was to Agnes de Beaumont, (died before 1105) lady of Conflans-Sainte-Honorine daughter of Yves II, Count of Beaumont-sur-Oise. Their children were:

- Matthieu I of Montmorency (d. 1160), Constable of France
- Thibaut of Montmorency (d. after 1147), accompanied King Louis VII on the Second Crusade.
- Adelinde of Montmorency m. Guy, lord of Guise

Bouchard's second wife was Agnes, daughter of Ralph, lord of Pontoise. They had:

- Herve of Montmorency

Bouchard's third wife was Adeliza de Clermont, daughter of Hugh, Count of Clermont-en-Beauvaisis, and Margaret de Ramerue, widow of Gilbert FitzRichard de Clare, lord of Clare and Tonbridge. Their children were:

- Hervé of Montmorency, Constable of Ireland(d. after 1172), he was married to Nesta, daughter of Maurice FitzGerald, lord of Llanstephan and Maynooth.
- Hugo
- Guy

== Sources ==
- Bradbury, Jim (2007). The Capetians: Kings of France 987-1328. Hambledon Continuum. ISBN 978 1 85285 528 4.
- Rollason, Lynda, ed. (2015). The Thorney Liber Vitae. The Boydell Press. ISBN 978 1 78327 010 1.
- Seale, Yvonne; Wacha, Heather, eds. (2023). The Cartulary of Prémontré. University of Toronto Press.
