= Jean I of Montmorency =

French nobleman

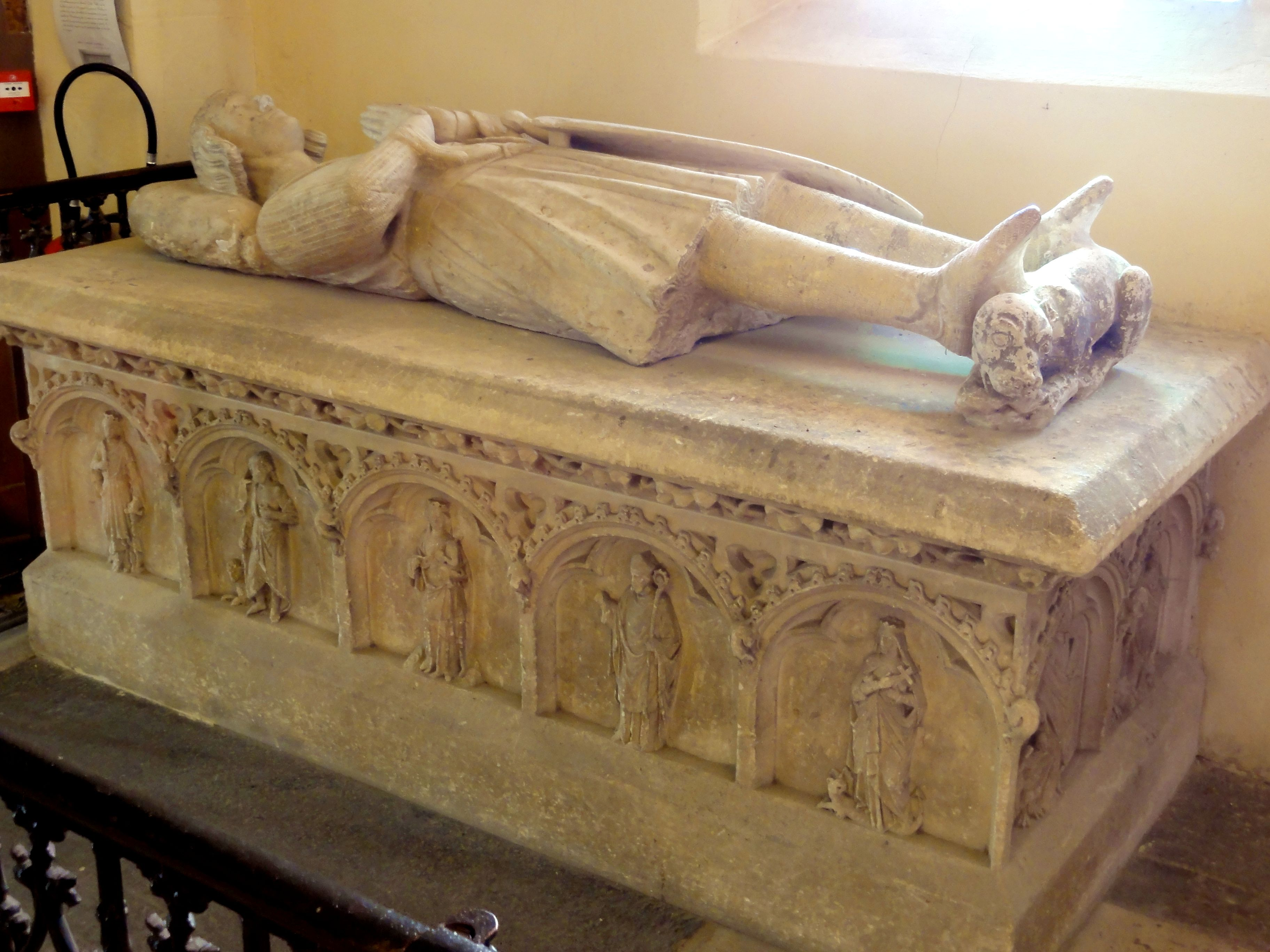
Recumbent effigy of Jean I of Montmorency

Jean I of Montmorency (1284–1326) was lord of Montmorency, Écouen, Argentan, Damville, and Berneval. He was a member of the house of Montmorency.

== Biography ==
He was the son of Matthew IV of Montmorency and Jeanne de Lévis.

Little is known about the life of this lord. He is mentioned together with his father in a document dated 5 August 1303, containing a list of lords who accompanied King Philip IV in the Franco-Flemish War, he may even have taken part in the battle of Mons-en-Pévèle the following year.

In 1305/1306, Jean succeeded his elder childless brother Matthew V, as lord of Montmorency. In 1309, he granted the Dominican monks of Argentan, known as the Jacobins, a vineyard located near their property.

He was in litigation for the inheritance of Jeanne de Chantilly, the widow of his elder brother, with her second husband, Jean de Guînes, viscount de Meaux. In 1313, the provost of Paris issued a decree, approved by Parliament, transferring the disputed lands into the hands of the King, pending a final decision.

Jean took part in the military campaign of Philip V, who gathered the feudal militia for the war in Flanders at Easter 1317. The war ended with a truce, extended until 1318.

Another charter of 31 March 1320, is known about the donation of land to the monastery in Argentan.

Jean died in June 1326, and was buried in the church at Conflans-Sainte-Honorine.

== Family ==
He was married to Jeanne de Caltot daughter of Robert lord of Berneval-en-Caux. She married Guillaume de Rochfort after his death.

- Charles I of Montmorency (d.1381) Marshal of France. He first married Marguerite de Beaujeu (d.1336), the daughter of Guichard VI de Beaujeu and Marie de Chatillon. His second marriage was to Jeanne de Roucy, lady of Blazon, and de Saint-Chimelières-en-Anjou (d.1361), daughter of Count Jean V de Roucy and Marguerite de Beaumières. His third marriage was to Pernelle de Veyères (d.1400/1415), lady of Vitry-en-Brie, de la Tour de Chaumont, and de Viyères-le-sac, daughter of Adam, lord of Viyères and Alice de Méry
- Matthew of Montmorency (d.1360) lord of Avereville, Buqueval, Goussainville. He was married (before 1349) to Eglantine de Vendôme, lady of Ventrousse and Charençois, daughter of Jean de Vendôme, lord of Chartres-sur-Loire, and Philippa de Mesalane, lady of La Ferté-Ernault. He was the progenitor of the line of the lords of Avereville.
- Jean of Montmorency, lord of Argentan
- Isabella of Montmorency (d. after 1341) She married in 1336, Jean I of Chatillon-sur-Marne (d.1363)
