= Bouchard I of Montmorency =

French knight

Bouchard I, Knight of Bray
- Died: after 960
- Noble family: House of Montmorency
- Spouse: Hildegarde of Blois
- Issue: Bouchard II of Montmorency

Bouchard de Bray, also Bouchard I of Montmorency (died after 960 and before 966) was a French knight from the Tenth Century. He was the ancestor of the noble House of Montmorency and the noble House of Montlhery.

== Life ==
He belongs to the family of the Alberic-Walter-Burchard, very present in the Province of Sens with two archbishops.

Bouchard was the keeper of the archbishopric castle of Bray-sur-Seine. This investiture was contested by the local family of the Bosonids.

Bouchard founded the priory of Saint-Sauveur-lès-Bray just north of the castle on the opposite bank of the Seine. He brought there the relics (c. 958) of saint Paterne and saint Pavace.

He married Hildegarde de Blois, a daughter of Theobald I, Count of Blois. His offspring were Bouchard II, le Barbu (the Bearded); Thibault de Bray, of Montlhéry, and Albéric, Lord of Vihiers. The dowry attached to Hildegarde might have been the land of the priory of Saint-Sauveur as it is issued from the stronghold lands of Centumliis or Cent-Ulmis hold by Theobald I and his son Theobald.

Boso probably taking advantage of the invasion of the kingdom by Bruno of Cologne in 960, burned down the town of Bray and recaptured the castle. The first Bouchard died shortly after because his widow Hildegarde eventually asked for the support of Count Renard I of Sens. The count of Sens used a kind of "right to spoil" on the castle of Bray but also on the priory since he took the relics back in his main keep in Sens. And if, according to the chronicle of Sens, the Count of Blois Theobald I pressured upon Renard of Sens to recover the relics of Saint-Sauveur, it is because the latter had gone beyond his right, the priory being in the county of Provins and not in the county of Sens. Odo I of Blois recovered most of the property and rights of Saint-Sauveur and united this priory to the Chartres abbey of Bonneval.

Hildegarde's young children came out weakened after these events. By showing their loyalty to the Duke of the Franks, Hugues Capet, after 978, that they will be able to bounce back, especially in Montmorency.

== See also ==
- House of Montmorency
