= Hervé of Montmorency =

French noble (died 1096)

Hervé of Montmorency (died 1096) was a French noble, lord of Montmorency, Écouen, Marly, Deuil, and a member of the House of Montmorency.

== Biography ==
He was the second son of Bouchard III of Montmorency, and his elder brother was Thibaud, Constable of France.

Hervé received the seigneury of Marly as an appanage. He is first mentioned in a charter issued by King Philip I to the priory of Saint-Martin-des-Champes in 1067. He rose to prominence at court and was appointed Grand Butler of France, the third most senior of all court titles. Hervé held this position from 1073/1074 to 1080/1082. Apart from his signature on documents issued by the Royal Chancellory, little is known about him, although André Duchesne described Hervé as "one of the most secular princes of the Kingdom".

After the death of his childless elder brother, he inherited the seigneury of Montmorency and reunited the family holdings.

== Family ==
Hervé was married to a woman named Agnes:

- Bouchard IV of Montmorency (d. after 1124), lord of Montmorency
- Geoffrey (d. after 1086), lord of Marisco
- Hervé
- Aubrey
- Avaise
