= Pierre-Joseph Charrin =

French poet, chansonnier, playwright and goguettier

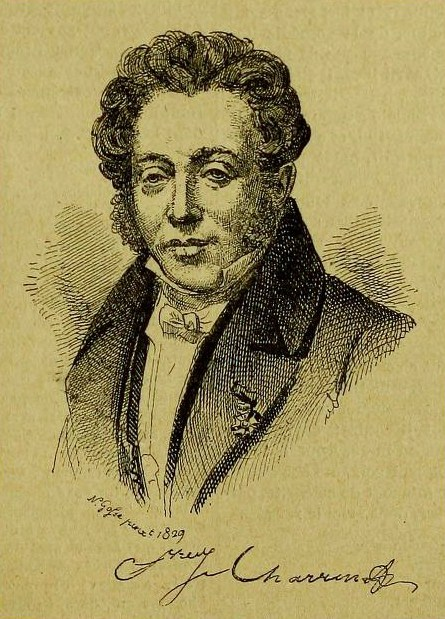
- Pierre-Joseph Charrin en 1829
- Born: 2 February 1784; Lyon
- Died: 24 April 1863 (aged 79); Écouen
- Occupations: Poet; Chansonnier

Pierre-Joseph Charrin (2 February 1784 – 25 April 1863) was a 19th-century French poet, chansonnier, playwright and goguettier.

He was a member of the Caveau moderne and founder, in 1813, of the Soupers de Momus.

14 August 1814, he was received in the Caveau lyonnais. On that occasion he wrote reception couplets.

In 1815, in collaboration with César de Proisy d'Eppe, Alexis Eymery, René Perrin and Joseph Tastu, he was one of the five editors of the Dictionnaire des girouettes, ou Nos contemporains peints d'après eux-mêmes ... par une société de girouettes... This 444 pages book which stigmatized the opportunists of the period 1789-1815, including illustrious members of the Caveau moderne such as Pierre-Antoine-Augustin de Piis and Emmanuel Dupaty, contributed to the demise of that society in 1817.

== Selected works ==
Poetry

- 1808: Le Cimetière de village; Tobie, ou les Captifs de Ninive; mes Loisirs
- 1817: le Passe-temps
- 1825: Album poétique.

Theatre

- 1806: Les deux Forteresses, Théâtre de l'Ambigu
- 1806: la Forêt d'Edimbourg, Théâtre de la Gaîté
- 1815: Amour, honneur et devoir, ou le Rapt, three-act melodrama in prose, imitated from Calderon, Théâtre de l'Ambigu
- 1820: Mahomet II, Théâtre de la Porte-Saint-Martin
- 1832: Un Mariage à bout portant; Lequel des deux ? in collaboration with M. Lesguillon (comedy)
- 1833: l'Égalité devant la loi, Théâtre du Panthéon
- 1834: Vingt-quatre heures d'un Duelliste
- 1834: un Roi en vacances, comédie en vaudeville in 3 acts and 6 tableaux; this play in three acts and six tableaux was supposed to be given at the Théâtre de l'Ambigu 12 September but was forbidden by censorship the very same day.
- 1850: l'Oubli du Devoir.
- 1851: une Fleur et un Soufflet (comedy).

Songs

- 1816: L'Enfant lyrique du Carnaval, published by Ourry, includes the song Les Amours d'un jeune Tambour. It was wrongly attributed to M. Delorme.
- 1817: Les Passe-Tems d'un momusien, ou Chansons et poésies by P.-J. Charrin
- 1817: Les soirées de famille. Tome 1, contes, nouvelles, traits historiques et anecdotes; recueil philosophique, moral et divertissant
- Les Passe-Tems d'un momusien, ou Chansons et poésies de P.-J. Charrin, Membre de plusieurs Académies, Convive des soupers de Momus, etc. Ornés de 4 Gravures et de 8 Airs notés. Locard et Davi éditeurs, Paris 1817, 201 pages.
- The collection by Théophile-Marion Dumersan and Noël Ségur, Chansons nationales et populaires de France précédées d'une Histoire de la chanson française et accompagnées de notes historiques et littéraires, 17th edition, reworked ans augmented, Garnier frères éditeur, Paris 1866, contains 12 songs by Pierre-Joseph Charrin.

== See also ==
- Goguette

== Sources ==
- La Muse gauloise. Journal de la chanson par tous et pour tous., numéro 8, 15 juin 1863.
