= Miles de Noyers =

French diplomat

Miles de Noyers (1271 – 21 September 1350) was a French diplomat and military leader. He was Marshal of France from January 1303, Grand Butler of France and bearer of the Oriflamme. He served with distinction under 5 French Kings in the Flanders and Gascony campaigns of the Hundred Years' War.

== Biography ==
He was a son of Miles V de Noyers and Marie de Châtillon. Gaucher V de Châtillon was his uncle.

He was present with Foulques du Merle at the first session of the Parlement of Toulouse. Philip IV of France sent him in 1305 with his uncle, Constable Gaucher V de Châtillon, to settle the dispute between the bishop and the inhabitants of Beauvais. That same year, in reward for his services, the King awarded him an income of 200 Livre tournois from the royal treasury. The following July, he was sent to Bordeaux with Guillaume de Martigné and Guillaume de Cortebuze to settle the dispute between the sovereign and the King of England regarding the Château de Mauléon.

He was among the lords appointed by Louis X to negotiate peace with Louis I, Count of Nevers, son of the Count of Flanders, which was ratified in May 1315. He was one of the executors of Philip IV's will and received an additional annuity of 200 livres, later confirmed by Philip V, to whom he rendered many services, particularly during the War of Flanders in 1318.

After the death of Philip V, he lent his services to his successor, Charles IV, who sent him to the Pope in Avignon in April 1322 and then to Flanders the following October. He was among the members of the commission that stipulated a truce with England on 26 May 1325, followed by a peace treaty on 31 May. The sovereign appointed him bearer of the Oriflamme in November 1325 and sent him with numerous armed men to Gascony against the English. He awarded him a reward of 5,000 livres tournois in a letter dated 17 November 1317, reiterated the following year.

He was no less highly regarded at the court of Philip VI, whom he followed to Flanders, taking part in the Battle of Cassel (1328), where he carried the Oriflamme. The King granted him an income of 400 livres tournois on various lands, appointed him to the Grand Council in 1332 with a salary of 2,000 livres, and appointed him Grand Butler of France after the death of Henri IV de Sully around 1336.

The enormous expenses incurred in participating in numerous campaigns, despite the generous rewards he received, forced him to appeal to the King in 1339: he obtained letters from the King, which ordered creditors to collect their dues only after his death, recovering them from movable property and the income from his lands.

In 1342, the King sent him for four months to the border between Flanders and Hainaut, to discuss the terms of a treaty with England and its allies. He was present at the Battle of Crécy in 1346, where he still carried the Oriflamme.
He died at an advanced age, in September 1350.

== In fiction ==
He is a supporting character in Les Rois maudits (The Accursed Kings), a series of French historical novels by Maurice Druon, and was portrayed by Michel Favory in the 1972 French miniseries adaptation of the series.
