= Louis Théophile Hingre =

Louis Théophile Hingre (also known as Théophile Hingre) was a French painter, sculptor, engraver, illustrator and poster artist. He was born in 1832 in Écouen, where he also died, in 1911. His specialty was sculptures of animals.

== Life and career ==
Hingre was born on 19 November 1832, in Écouen.

At the age of 12, he was apprenticed in Paris to the studio of Henri Louis Gervais and Adrien Possot to learn ornamental sculpture and manufacture of bronzes. His apprenticeship continued until he was 25. In 1851, at the age of 19, he married Louise Dailly. They had four children, Maximilien, Clémentine, Marguerite and finally Leon, who also became a painter, forging his career in England.

During Hingre's career, he was a member of the artistic jury of his department (d'État de la Seine) from 1896 till 1906, an officer of the Academy of Arts from 1899 and a public teacher of the arts from 1908.

A republican by political orientation, he was close to Louis Blanc, having met him during the 1848 revolution. He made sculptures for republican banquets, photographs of which remain, although the works themselves are lost. Because of his political activism, Hingre twice had to flee to England, once in 1848, and once in 1858. While in England, he worked in Birmingham as the ornamental sculptor of Elkington & Co. During this employment he first began to sculpt animals; is first works were horse racing trophies. He first exhibited at the Salon in 1860, despite his British exile.

He continued to work for Elkington & Co until he returned to France. In 1869, after his return to France, he lived in Paris. There he regularly took part in the competitions of the 'Union centrale des arts décoratifs' and exhibited almost yearly at the Salon until he was 78. He presented 45 works in the years 1860 to 1910. He was also a member of many goldsmiths organisations. He won a gold medal at the 1878 International Workers Collective Exhibition, and collaborated on works that obtained medals at the 1878 and 1890 Universal Expositions.

His admiration for Mucha, and his reputation as a poster artist, led to him being hired to produce Art Nouveau style posters for the Violet perfume house.

At the age of 79, he died on 12 November 1911 at the house of his daughter Clémentine in Écouen. A street in Écouen is named for him.

== Works ==
An example of Hingre's work can be found at the Victoria and Albert Museum, where a poster he designed for Theophile Roederer champagne can be seen.

== Gallery ==
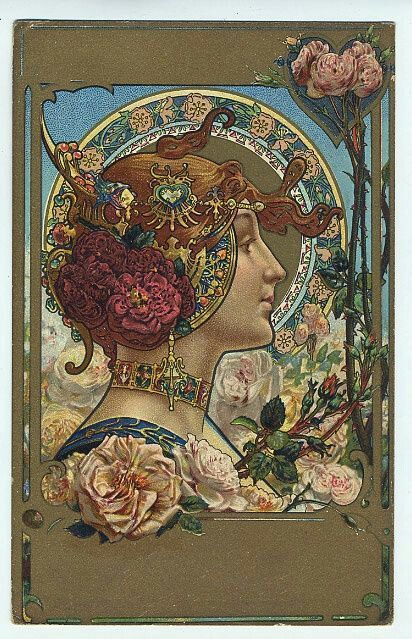

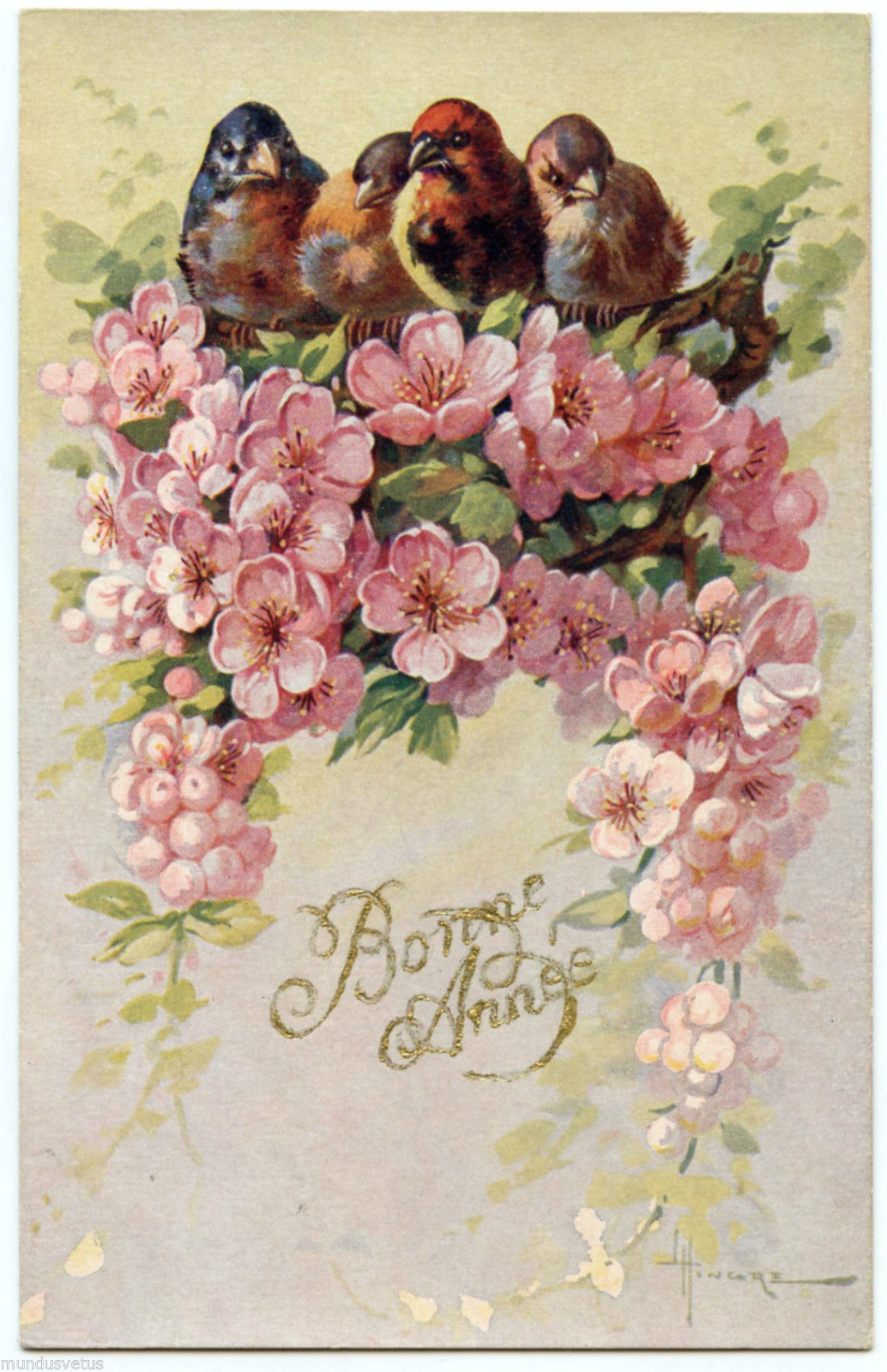

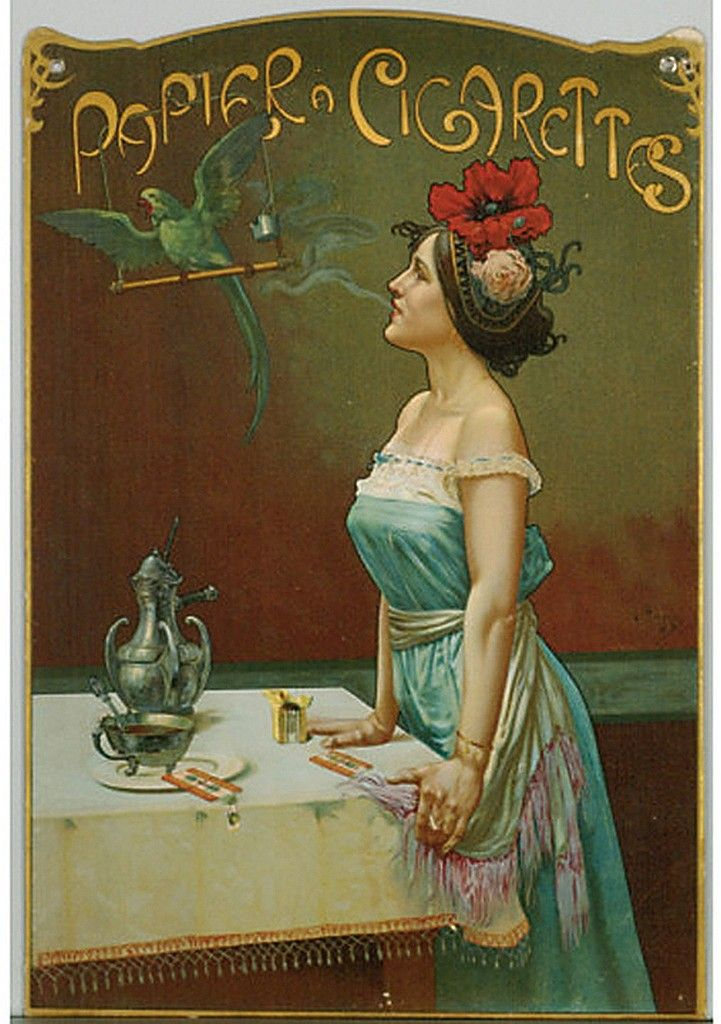

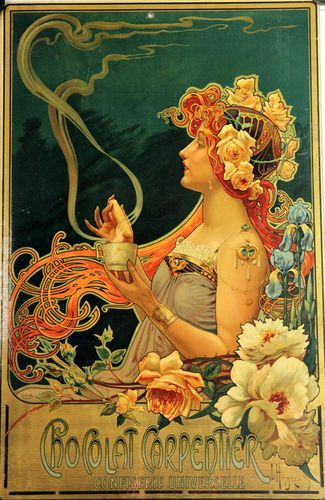

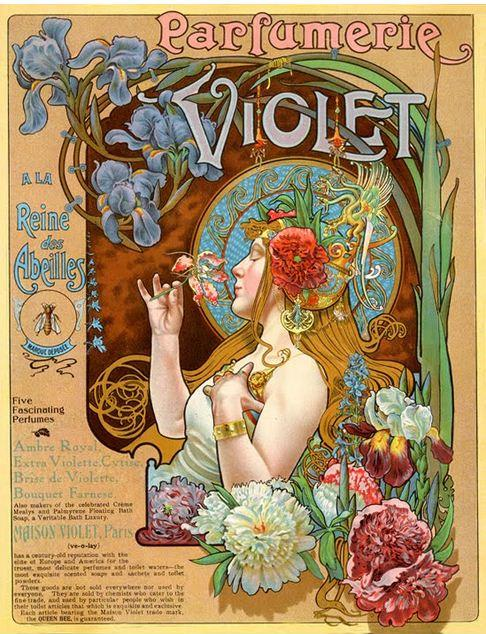

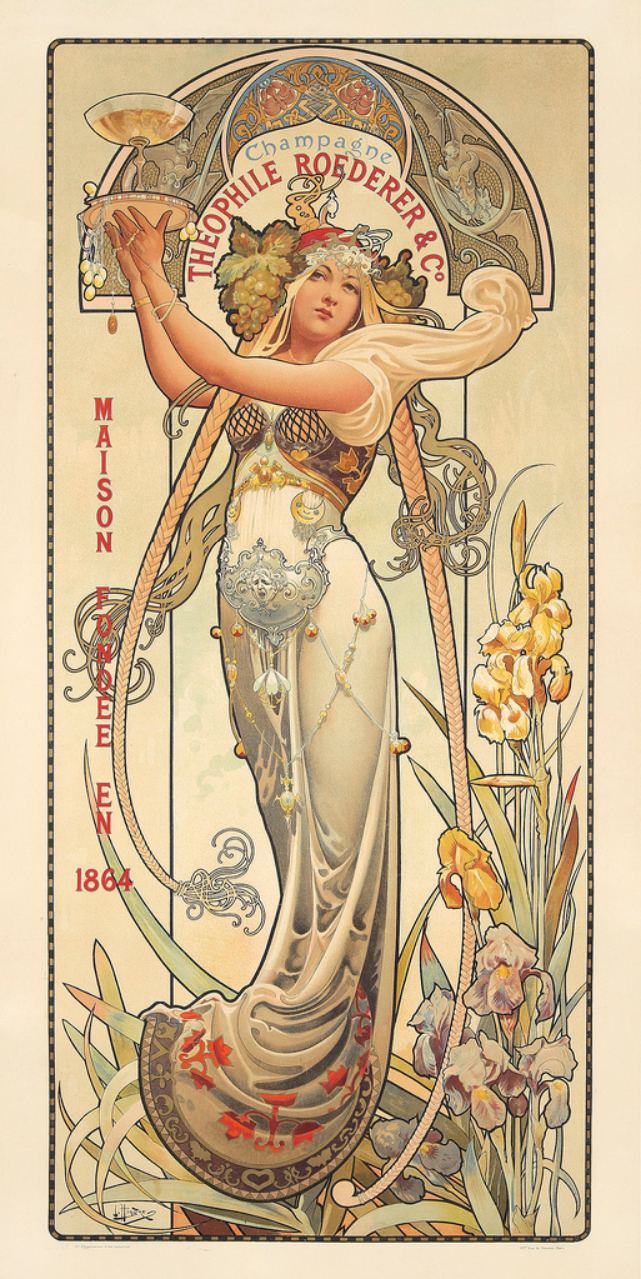

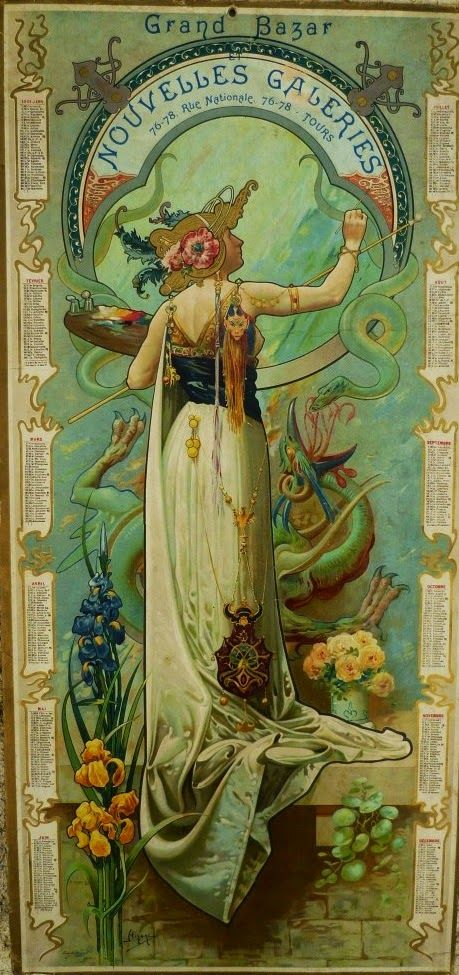
