= Bouchard V of Montmorency =

French noble (died 1189)

Bouchard V of Montmorency (died 1189) was a French noble. He was lord of Montmorency, Écouen Marly, Feuyard, Saint-Brice, Épinay-sur-Seine, Conflans-Sainte-Honorine and many other lordships.

== Biography ==
Bouchard was the son of the Constable of France, Mathieu I of Montmorency and Alice FitzRoy, illegitimate daughter of King Henry I of England.

He appeared at the French court in the early 1150s and soon became one of the confidants of King Louis VII, for whom he carried out various important assignments.

In 1151, Bouchard was one of the most important lords who accompanied the King on his journey to Sens and is mentioned in the charter of the Archbishop of Sens as a witness to a donation together with King Louis and Thierry Galeran, the second of the King's confidants.

Being the grandson of the King of England, having married a woman whose lineage went back to Charlemagne, and having become through this marriage, a relative of Philip Augustus, Bouchard was considered one of the most powerful barons of the Kingdom of France and began to style himself "by the grace of God, lord Montmorency".

In 1189, he took the cross, but died before the royal army set out on the Third Crusade.

== Family ==
In 1173, he married Lauretta of Hainaut, (d.1181), daughter of Baldwin IV, Count of Hainaut, and Alice of Namur. Their children were:

- Mathieu II of Montmorency, (d.1230), lord of Montmorency and Constable of France
- Eva
- Alice of Montmorency, married to Simon V de Montfort (1180–1218) Lord of Montfort, Earl of Leicester and Count of Toulouse

== Sources ==
- Baldwin, John W. (2019). Knights, Lords, and Ladies: In Search of Aristocrats in the Paris Region. University of Pennsylvania Press.
- Bennett, Stephen (2021). Elite Participation in the Third Crusade. The Boydell Press.
- Hollister, C. Warren (2001). Henry I. Yale University Press.
