= Alice FitzRoy =

Illegitimate daughter of Henry I of England

- Spouse: Matthew I of Montmorency (m. 1126)
- Issue: Henry; Bouchard V; Theobald; Herve; Matthieu
- Father: Henry I of England

Alix or Aline FitzRoy (d. before 1141) was the illegitimate daughter of King Henry I of England by one of his many mistresses. She married Matthieu I of Montmorency and had the following issue:

1. Henry, died young before 1160
2. Bouchard V de Montmorency, (d. 1189 in Jerusalem), who married in 1173 Laurette of Hainaut (d. 9 August 1181), daughter of Count Baldwin IV of Hainaut. They had a son Matthieu II de Montmorency, nicknamed the Great.
3. Theobald de Montmorency, seigneur de Marly, he went on crusade in 1173. He died as a Cistercian monk sometime after 1189.
4. Herve de Montmorency, abbot of Saint-Martin de Montmorency, then deacon of the Church and dean of Paris before his death in 1192.
5. Matthieu de Montmorency (d. Constantinople 1204), he inherited the lordship from his brother Theobald.

Alix died before 1141. Her husband Matthieu married Adelaide of Maurienne, the widow of Louis VI of France.

== Sources ==
- Henneman, John Bell Jr. (1995). "Adelaide of Savoy". In Kibler, William W.; Zinn, Grover A. (eds.). Medieval France: An Encyclopedia. Routledge.
- Zerner, Monique (1992). "L'epousa de Simon de Montfort, et la croisade albigeoise". In Duby, Georges (ed.). Femmes, mariages, lignages – XIIe-XIVe siècles: Mélanges offerts à Georges Duby (in French). De Boeck-Wesmael.
