= Matthew IV of Montmorency =

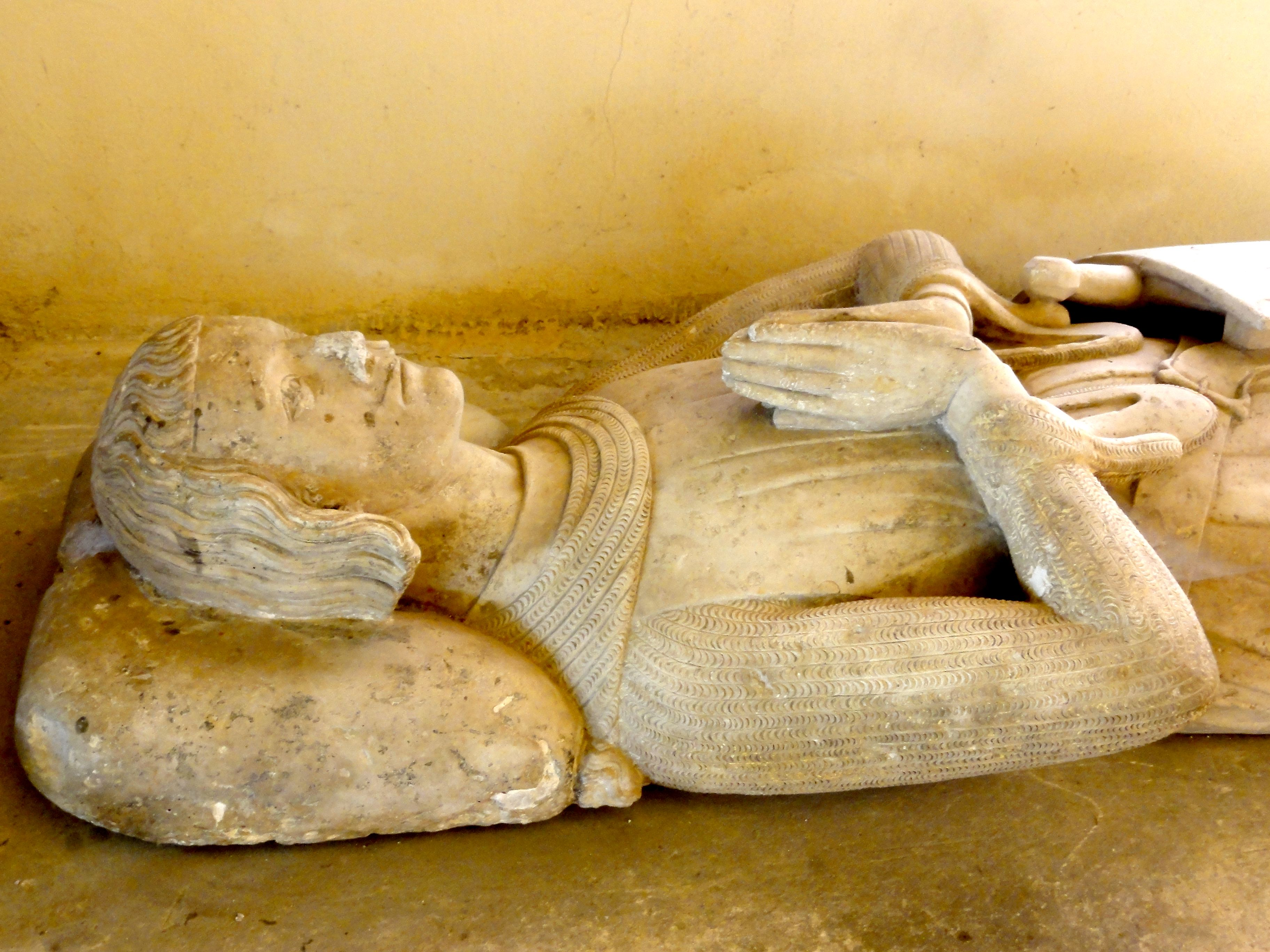
Matthew's tomb slab in the priory of Conflans-Sainte-Honorine

Matthew IV the Great (1252–1305) was lord of Montmorency, Écouen, Argentan, and Damville. He was a military leader of France, Grand Chamberlain of France and Admiral of France.

== Biography ==
He was the son of Matthew III of Montmorency and Jeanne de Brienne.

In 1282 Matthew IV joined in the Italian campaign of Robert II, Count of Artois, who came to the aid of Charles I of Sicily against the Aragonese, who had captured Sicily. In 1285 he fought in the Aragonese Crusade.

During the Gascon War, Matthew fought the English in Guînes, and in 1295 he was appointed admiral and given command of a large squadron to conduct raiding expeditions in England. On 1 August, he landed with a 15,000-strong army in front of Dover, captured it, plundered and burned it, but failed in an attack on the citadel.

During the Franco-Flemish War, Matthew took part in the battles of Furnes and Courtai; he distinguished himself in the battle of Mons-en-Pévèle and was granted the fief of Damville and the office of Grand Chamberlain of France by King Philip IV.

== Family ==
His first wife (m.1273) was Maria de Dreux (1261–1276), the daughter of Robert IV Count of Dreux and Beatrice de Montfort. A papal dispensation was required for this marriage as the bride and groom were in the fifth degree of kinship.

His second wife (m.1278) was Jeanne de Lévis (d.1307/1309), daughter of Guy III de Lévis, Seigneur de Mirepoix, and Isabella de Marly.

- Matthew V of Montmorency (d.1305/1306), lord of Montmorency. He was married to Jeanne le Bouteiller de Senlis, daughter of Guillaume VI le Bouteiller de Senlis, lord of Chantilly, and Eleanor de Bosso.
- Jean I of Montmorency (d.1326) lord of Montmorency. He was married to Jeanne de Caltot, daughter of Robert de Caltot, lord of Berneval-en-Caux
- Alice
- Isabella
