= Matthew III of Montmorency =

French aristocrat

Matthew III of Montmorency (died 1270) was a member of the House of Montmorency, lord of Montmorency and many other lordships from 1243 until his death.

== Biography ==
He was the son of Bouchard VI of Montmorency and Isabella de Laval.

After the death of his uncle, Matthias of Montmorency, lord of Attichy, Matthew unsuccessfully attempted to sue for his uncle's possessions, which had passed to the deceased's brother Guy VII de Laval. Matthew III's father was the eldest brother and had priority in inheritance, but he died before the lord of Attichy, and so King Louis IX awarded the disputed lands to Guy VII de Laval.

In 1270, Matthew went with the King on the Seventh Crusade to Tunis, and died there of dysentery.

== Family ==
He was married to Jeanne de Brienne, (d.1270), daughter of Erard II de Brienne, lord of Ramrue, pretender to the Kingdom of Jerusalem and the Kingdom of Cyprus. Their children were:

- Matthieu IV of Montmorency (d.1305)
- Erard of Montmorency (d. before 1334), lord of Conflans-Sainte-Honorine
- Jeanne of Montmorency
