= Hervey de Montmorency =

Anglo-Norman adventurer (fl. 1169)

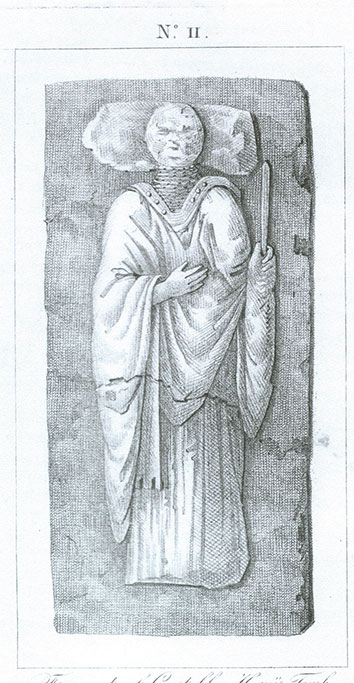
- Supposed effigy of Montmorency at Dunbrody Abbey
- Occupation: Adventurer

Herve de Montmorency (fl. 1169) was an Anglo-Norman adventurer and invader of Ireland. (Note: His name also appears variously as Mount-Maurice, Monte Mauricii, Monte Marisco, Monte Marecy, Montmarreis, Montmorenci, Mumoreci, and Momorci.)

== Family ==
Hervey was the son of Bouchard IV of Montmorency and Agnes of Pontoise, daughter of Raoul de Pontoise. He served Louis VI and Louis VII of France. He married Elizabeth, daughter of Robert de Beaumont (d. 1118), Count of Meulan, and widow of Gilbert de Clare.

== Life ==
Hervey was sent by his nephew, Earl Richard, to Ireland with Robert FitzStephen in 1169 to report on affairs there. After the victory of these first invaders at Wexford their ally Derruot, king of Leinster, rewarded him with two cantreds of land on the coast between Wexford and Waterford, and he appears to have shared in Dermot's raids on Ossory and Offaly. On the landing of Raymond FitzGerald at Dundunnolf, near Waterford, Hervey joined him, and shared in his victory over the people of Waterford and the chief, Donnell O'Phelan. Giraldus Cambrensis puts into his mouth a speech recommending the slaughter of seventy Waterford men who had been taken prisoners; but the Anglo-Norman poet of the Conquest gives a wholly different version of the event. He remained with Raymond in an entrenched position in Bannow Bay until they were reinforced on 23 August by the arrival of Earl Richard, who was joined by Hervey. Raymond's mission to Henry II having failed, Earl Richard sent Hervey to the king, probably in August 1171, to make his peace.

On his return Hervey met the earl at Waterford, told him that Henry required his attendance, accompanied him to England, and at Newnham, Gloucestershire, was the means of arranging matters between him and the king. During Henry's visit to Ireland Hervey probably acted as the marshal of the royal army; for in his charter for the foundation of the convent of Dunbrothy, where his name is given as "Hereveius de Monte Moricii", he is described as "marshal of the army of the king for Ireland, and seneschal of all the lands of Earl Richard".

While Earl Richard was in Normandy in 1173 Hervey was left in command. On the earl's return he is said to have found the Irish ready to rebel, and the troops dissatisfied and clamouring that Raymond should command them; for Hervey is represented as having wasted the money that was due to them in action. The earl yielded to the demand of the soldiers, and gave Raymond the command, but shortly afterwards refused to appoint him constable of Leinster, and gave the office to Hervey. To the bad advice of Hervey Giraldus attributes the earl's disastrous expedition into Munster in 1174. After the defeat at Thurles the earl was forced to shut himself up in Waterford; he sent for Raymond to come to his help, and appointed him constable in place of Hervey. Hervey received from the earl a grant of O'Barthy, of which the present barony of Bargy, co. Wexford, forms a part, was outwardly reconciled to his rival Raymond, and married Nesta, daughter of Maurice Fitzgerald (d. 1176), and Raymond's first cousin. Nevertheless, in 1175 he sent messages to the king, accusing Raymond of a design to make himself independent of the royal authority, and was evidently believed by Henry.

Hervey's power in Ireland was probably shaken by the death of his nephew, Earl Richard, in 1176, and we find him in England in 1177, when he witnessed a charter of Henry II at Oxford, at which date his lands between Wexford and Waterford were made to do service to Waterford, then held by William Fitz Aldhelm. In 1178 he made a grant of lands in present co. Wexford to the convent of Buildwas, Shropshire, for the foundation on them of a Cistercian house (the date is determined by the attestation of Felix, bishop of Ossory). These lands included Dunbrodiki, or Dunbrothy, in the barony of Shelburne, and there a few years later was founded the convent called de portu S. Marise. In 1179 he became a monk of Christ Church, Canterbury, making a grant to that house of lands and churches in Ireland. Many of these have been identified; they were in 1245 transferred by the convent to the abbot of Tintern, co. Wexford, for 625 marks, and an annual rent of ten marks, with the obligation of maintaining a chaplain at St Brendan's chapel at Bannow, to pray for the souls of Hervey and other benefactors.

Giraldus says that Hervey was not a better man after his retirement than he had been before. A Hervey, cellarer and chanter of Christ Church, was excommunicated by Archbishop Baldwin for his share in the great quarrel between the archbishop and the convent, and was alive in 1191, but he could scarcely have been Hervey de Mount-Maurice, who is described as "conversus et benefactor" in the records of his obit on 12 March.

== Death and legacy ==
M. de Montmorency-Morres asserts, apparently without any ground, that Hervey died in 1205, and says that his nephews, Geoffrey de Marisco and Richard, bishop of Leighlin, transported his body from Canterbury to Dunbrothy, where they erected a tomb of black Kilkenny marble to him in the conventual church. Of this tomb and the recumbent figure upon it he gives two engravings; it was overthrown in 1798, and has since perished. Hervey left no legitimate children.

He is described by Giraldus as a tall and handsome man, with blue and prominent eyes, and cheerful countenance; he was broad-chested, and had long hands and arms, and well-shaped legs and feet. Morally, Giraldus says he belied his appearance; he was extremely lustful, envious, and deceitful, a slanderer, untrustworthy, and changeable, more given to spite than to gallant deeds, and fonder of pleasure than of profitable enterprise. From this estimate and from other evil things that Giraldus says of Hervey large deductions should be made, for Giraldus wrote in the interest of his relatives, the Geraldines, and speaks violently of all who opposed them. As, then, Hervey was the rival and enemy of Raymond Fitzgerald, he and his doings are represented in the Expugnatio in a most unfavourable light. Even Giraldus, however, allows that Hervey was one of the four principal conquerors of the Irish.

== Sources ==
This article incorporates text from a publication now in the public domain: Hunt, William (1894). "Mount-Maurice, Hervey de". In Lee, Sidney (ed.). Dictionary of National Biography. Vol. 39. London: Smith, Elder & Co.
