= Bouchard II of Montmorency =

French aristocrat (died 1020)

Bouchard II (died 1020), known as Bouchard le Barbu (Bouchard the Bearded) was a French aristocrat, holding the position of Lord of Montmorency.

Bouchard was one of the most significant lords of France under the first reign of Robert, son of King Hugh Capet. He had a dispute with the Abbot of Saint Denis about Basset Castle in L'Île-Saint-Denis. From this stronghold Bouchard ransomed the boats that passed within reach, including those of the monks of the abbey of Saint-Denis. Abbot Vivien complained to King Robert II the Pious. A royal trial took place, opposing Bouchard to Vivien. By a judgment of his peer barons and the king, on January 25, 997, he was forced to respect the royal protection granted to the monks of Saint-Denis, to demolish the Basset Castle, and to accept the exchange of his island of Saint-Denis against the castle and the fief of Montmorency.

He married the widow of Hugues Basset, a knight of Château-Basset.

He was succeeded by his son Bouchard III upon his death in 1020.
