= Charles I de Montmorency =

14th-century Marshal of France

- Died: 11 September 1381
- Father: Jean I of Montmorency

Charles I de Montmorency (died 11 September 1381) was a 14th-century French noble.

== Biography ==
Montmorency was a son of Jean I, lord of Montmorency and Jeanne de Calletot. He inherited the seigneuries of Montmorency, Ecouen, Damville, Argentan, Feuillarde, Chaumont-en-Vexin, Vitry en Brie and others upon the death of his father.

He was knighted, named Grand Panetier of France from 1336 to 1343 by King Philip VI of France, then was raised to the dignity of Marshal of France in 1343, was an advisor and chamberlain of Philip VI in 1346, and in 1347, captain general on the borders of County of Flanders and the sea near Picardy.

In 1347, he resigned from his position as marshal in favour of his brother-in-law, Edouard de Beaujeu.

He commanded the army that Duke John of Normandy led in Brittany to help Charles de Blois. He accompanied this prince in Guyenne against Henry, Earl of Derby in 1345 and distinguished himself at the Battle of Crécy in 1346.

Appointed as the Governor of Picardy, he defeated Oudart, bastard of Renty in 1348.

In 1356 Charles had the domain of Argentan when the English took control of the town as part of the Hundred Years' War.

He helped conclude the Treaty of Brétigny between the Philip VI and King Edward III of England, dated 8 May 1360.

He died on 11 September 1381 and was buried in the church of the Val Abbey in Meriel, near L'Isle-Adam.

== Marriage and issue ==
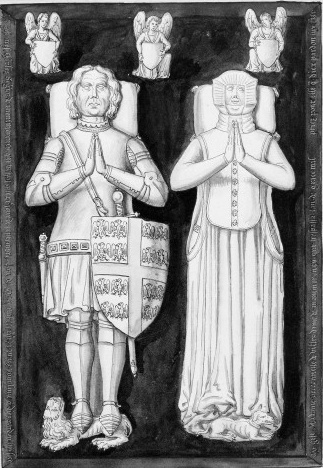
Tomb of Charles de Montmorency and Péronnelle de Villiers.

In 1330, Charles married firstly Marguerite de Beaujeu (died 5 January 1336) daughter of Guichard VI de Beaujeu and Marguerite de Châtillon. There was no issue from this marriage.

On 26 January 1341 in Paris, married secondly Jeanne de Roucy, Lady of Blazon and Chemillé (died 10 January 1361) daughter of Jean V de Roucy and Marguerite de Beaumez. They had the following issue:

- Jean de Montmorency (died 24 July 1352);
- Marguerite de Montmorency, married Robert d'Estouteville, seigneur de Vallemont.
- Jeanne de Montmorency, married Guy dit Brumor de Laval, seigneur de Challouyau.
- Marie de Montmorency, dame d'Argentan (died 26 February 1372), married firstly Guillaume d'Ivry, baron d'Oissery and secondly Jean II, seigneur de Châtillon-sur-Marne, grand steward of the queen and captain of the city of Reims.

Around 1362, Charles married thirdly Pétronille ou Pernelle de Villiers daughter of Adam dit le Bègue, seigneur de Villiers le Sec and Alix de Méry. They had the following known issue:

- Charles de Montmorency (died 1369);
- Jacques de Montmorency (died 1414);
- Philippe de Montmorency, killed in 1425 during the Battle of Ziric-Zée.
- Denise de Montmorency, married de Lancelot Turpin de Crissé.
