= Matthew I of Montmorency =

Constable of France (1138-1160), Lord of Montmorency

Matthew I (French: Mathieu de Montmorency; died 1160) was lord of Montmorency, Marly, Conflans-Sainte-Honorine and Attichy. He was also Constable of France from 1138 to 1160 under Louis VII.

He was the eldest son of Bouchard IV de Montmorency and Agnes de Beaumont-sur-Oise.

In 1126 he married Alice FitzRoy (Alix), illegitimate daughter of King Henry I of England, and had the following issue:

1. Henri, died young before 1160
2. Bouchard V de Montmorency, (d. 1189 in Jerusalem), who married in 1173 Laurette of Hainaut (d. 9 August 1181), daughter of Count Baldwin IV of Hainaut. They had a son Matthieu II de Montmorency, nicknamed the Great.
3. Theobald de Montmorency, seigneur de Marly, he went on crusade in 1173. He died as a Cistercian monk sometime after 1189.
4. Herve de Montmorency, abbot of Saint-Martin de Montmorency, then deacon of the Church and dean of Paris before his death in 1192.
5. Matthieu de Montmorency (d. Constantinople 1204), he inherited the lordship from his brother Theobald; father of Bouchard de Marly.

Alix died before 1141. Matthew then married Adelaide of Maurienne, the widow of Louis VI of France.

== Sources ==
- Baldwin, John W. (2019). Knights, Lords, and Ladies: In Search of Aristocrats in the Paris Region, 1180-1220. University of Pennsylvania Press.
- Crouch, David (1986). The Beaumont Twins: The Roots and Branches of Power in the Twelfth Century. Cambridge University Press.
- Henneman, John Bell Jr. (1995). "Adelaide of Savoy". In Kibler, William W.; Zinn, Grover A. (eds.). Medieval France: An Encyclopedia. Routledge.
- Lippiatt, G. E. M. (2017). Simon V of Montfort and Baronial Government, 1195-1218. Oxford University Press.
- Seale, Yvonne; Wacha, Heather, eds. (2023). The Cartulary of Prémontré. University of Toronto Press.
- Zerner, Monique (1992). "L'epousa de Simon de Montfort, et la croisade albigeoise". In Duby, Georges (ed.). Femmes, mariages, lignages – XIIe-XIVe siècles: Mélanges offerts à Georges Duby (in French). De Boeck-Wesmael.
