= Grand Butler of France =

The Grand Butler of France (French: Grand bouteiller de France) was one of the great offices of state in France, existing between the Middle Ages and the Revolution of 1789. Originally responsible for the maintenance of the royal vineyards, and provisioning the court with wine, the Grand Butler's role became less and less important and more ceremonial over time.

== List of Grand Butlers of France ==
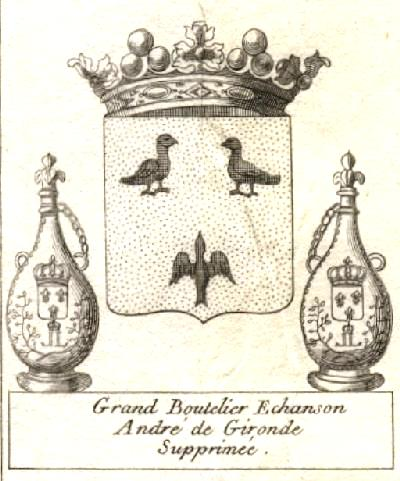
Arms of André de Gironde as Grand Butler. Note the wine-flasks as supporters.

- Ingenulf, brother of Baldric de Dreux, Constable of France: 1043-c.1069
- Hervé de Montmorency : circa 1080
- Louis de Senlis : before 1128
- Guillaume de Senlis : 1129–1147
- Guy III de Senlis : 1147
- Guy IV de Senlis : 1223
- Robert de Courtenay : took the cross during the Barons' Crusade of 1239–1241
- Estienne de Sancerre : before 1248
- John II of Brienne : before 1258
- Guy de Châtillon : 25 May 1296
- Henri IV de Sully : April 1317 captured by the Scots at the Battle of Old Byland
- Miles de Noyers : before 1336 – after 1346
- Jean de Chalon : before 1350–1361
- Jean de Sarrebruche : circa 1370
- Enguerrand VII, Lord of Coucy : circa 1384
- Guy Damas, seigneur de Cousan et de la Perrière : 15 May 1385
- Louis de Gyac : 1386–1389
- Jacques de Bourbon: 26 July 1397
- Charles de Savoisy : 1409–1413
- Guillaume IV de Melun : 29 April 1402 – 21 July 1410
- Pierre des Essarts : 21 July 1410
- Waléran de Luxembourg, comte de Saint-Pol : 29 October 1410 – 9 February 1412
- Jean de Croy : 9 February 1412
- Robert de Bar : sworn in 6 October 1413 despite opposition from Jean de Croy who had previously held the office.
- Jean de Craon : 1413
- Jean d'Estouteville : 10 November 1415
- Jean de Neufchatel : 30 July 1418
- Jacques de Dinan : in office 1427
- Jean de Rosnivinen : in office 1442
- Guillaume de Rosnivinen : 16 January 1446
- Louis d'Estouteville : in office 1443
- Antoine de Châteauneuf : circa 1464
- Jean du Fou : in office 1470
- Charles de Rohan : in office until 1516
- François Baraton : in office until 1519
- Adrien de Hangest : in office until 1532
- Louis IV de Bueil, Comte de Sancerre : in office 1533-1563
- Jean VII de Büeil, d.1638
- René de Bueil, d. 1640
- Jean de Büeil, comte de Marans, d.1665
- Pierre de Perrien, marquis de Crenan, d.1670
- Louis de Beaupoil, marquis de Lanmary, d.1702
- Marc Antoine de Beaupoil, his son : in office until 1731
- André de Gironde, comte de Buron : in office 1731-1756
- Eusèbe-Félix Chaspoux de Verneuil : in office 1756-1791
