= Écouen =

- Commune
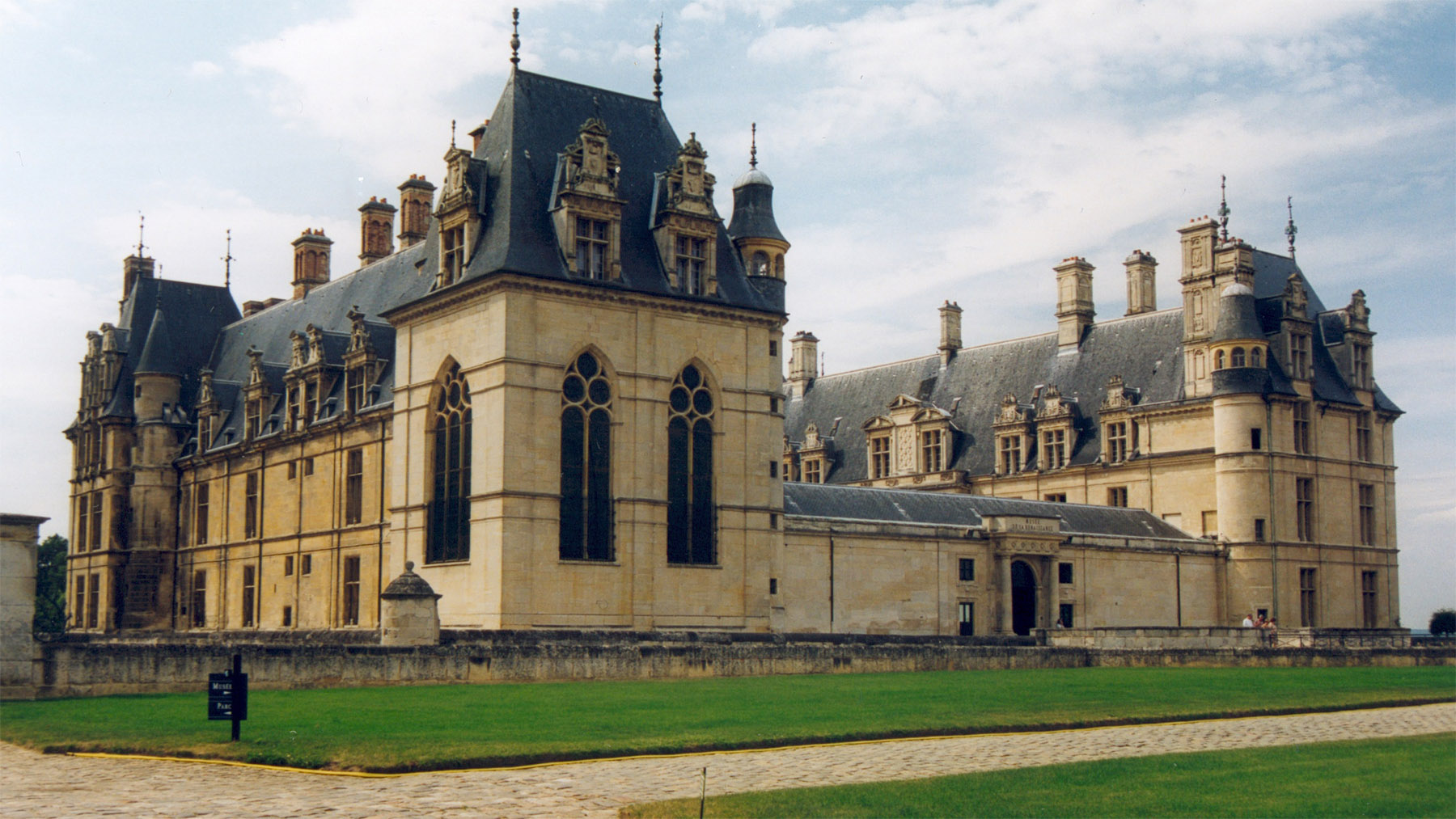
- Château d'Écouen in the town center

- Coat of arms
- Location of Écouen
- Location within France Location within Île-de-France (region)
- Coordinates: 49°01′10″N 2°22′54″E
- Country: France
- Region: Île-de-France
- Department: Val-d'Oise
- Arrondissement: Sarcelles
- Canton: Fosses
- Intercommunality: CA Roissy Pays de France

Government
  - Mayor (2020–2026): Catherine Delprat
- Area^{1}: 7.59 km^{2} (2.93 sq mi)
- Elevation: 130 m (430 ft)
- Population (2023): 7,202
  - Density: 949/km^{2} (2,460/sq mi)
- Time zone: UTC+01:00 (CET)
  - Summer (DST): UTC+02:00 (CEST)
- INSEE/Postal code: 95205 /95440
- ^{1} French Land Register data, which excludes lakes, ponds, glaciers > 1 km^{2} (0.386 sq mi or 247 acres) and river estuaries.

Écouen (French pronunciation: [ekwɑ̃]) is a commune in the Val-d'Oise department, in the northern suburbs of Paris, France. It is located 18.4 km (11.4 mi) from the center of Paris. The 19th-century poet and playwright Pierre-Joseph Charrin (1784–1863) died in Écouen. The artist Louis Théophile Hingre lived and worked in Écouen.

Écouen houses the Château d'Écouen, home of the Montmorency family. This château, built during the Renaissance, houses the Musée national de la Renaissance, the largest Renaissance museum in France.

== Population ==
Historical population
| Year | Pop. | ±% p.a. |
|---|---|---|
| 1968 | 3,887 | — |
| 1975 | 4,494 | +2.09% |
| 1982 | 4,338 | −0.50% |
| 1990 | 4,846 | +1.39% |
| 1999 | 7,084 | +4.31% |
| 2007 | 7,383 | +0.52% |
| 2012 | 7,253 | −0.35% |
| 2017 | 7,188 | −0.18% |
| 2023 | 7,202 | +0.03% |
Source: INSEE

== Transport ==
Écouen is served by Écouen – Ézanville station on the Transilien Paris – Nord suburban rail line. This station is located at the border between the commune of Écouen and the commune of Ézanville, on the Ézanville side of the border.

== See also ==
- Communes of the Val-d'Oise department
