= The Large Horse =

Sculpture in Houston, Texas, U.S.

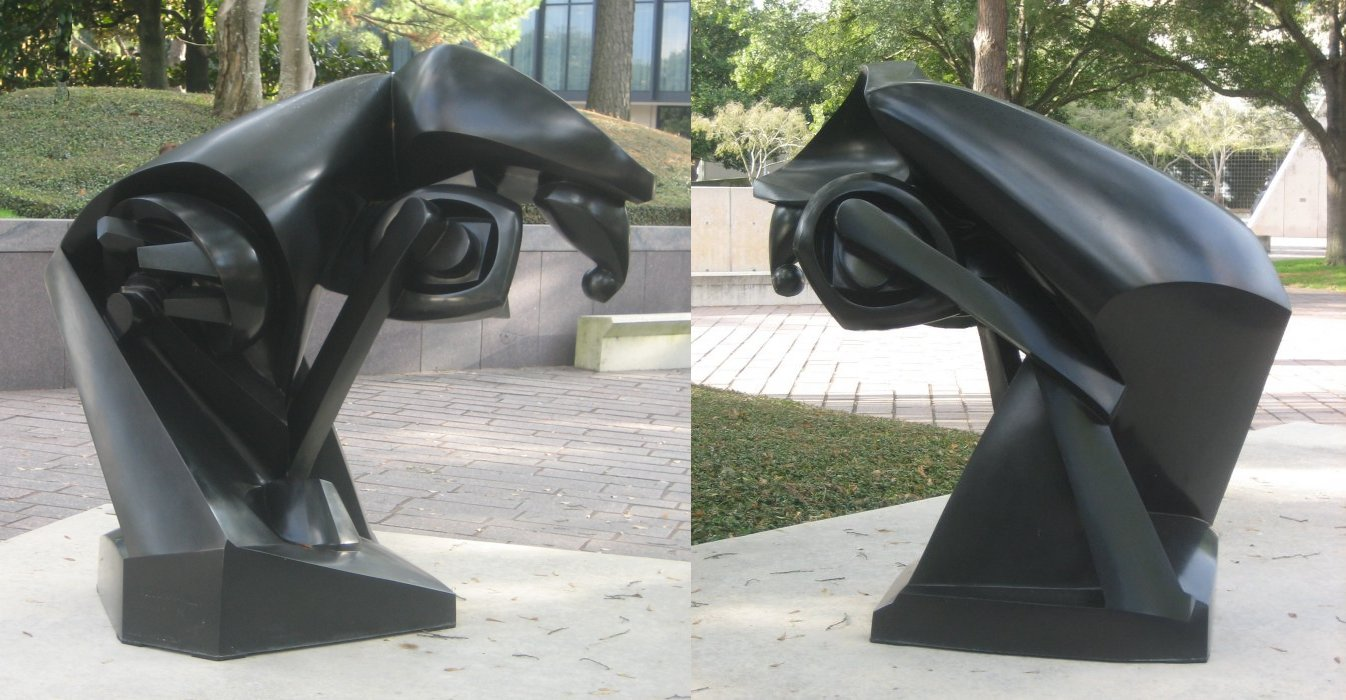
- Two views of the sculpture
- Artist: Raymond Duchamp-Villon
- Year: 1914
- Type: Sculpture
- Medium: Bronze
- Subject: Horse
- Location: Museum of Fine Arts, Houston; Houston, Texas, United States; 29°43′35.3″N 95°23′25.4″W
- Owner: Museum of Fine Arts, Houston

The Large Horse (French: Le Grand cheval) is a 1914-31 bronze sculpture by French artist Raymond Duchamp-Villon, installed at the Museum of Fine Arts, Houston's (MFAH) Lillie and Hugh Roy Cullen Sculpture Garden in Houston, Texas, in the United States.

== Description ==
Raymond Duchamp-Villon's Le cheval was designed in 1914. An enlargement from the original plaster made by Duchamp-Villon to 1 meter, was performed under the supervision of the artists brother Jacques Villon in 1930–1931.

The Large Horse measures 59 x 60 1/4 x 37 3/4 inches. The sculpture was purchased by the museum with funds from its board of trustees. Houston Press called the work "semi-abstract with some cubistic elements but that, more important, roars with its own energy. It reeks of perfection, of a difficult artistic goal not only met but exceeded, and is fascinating and witty. It's clear that we are seeing the talent of genius."

== See also ==
- 1914 in art
- Cubist sculpture
- List of public art in Houston
