= Buis-sur-Damville =

- Part of Mesnils-sur-Iton
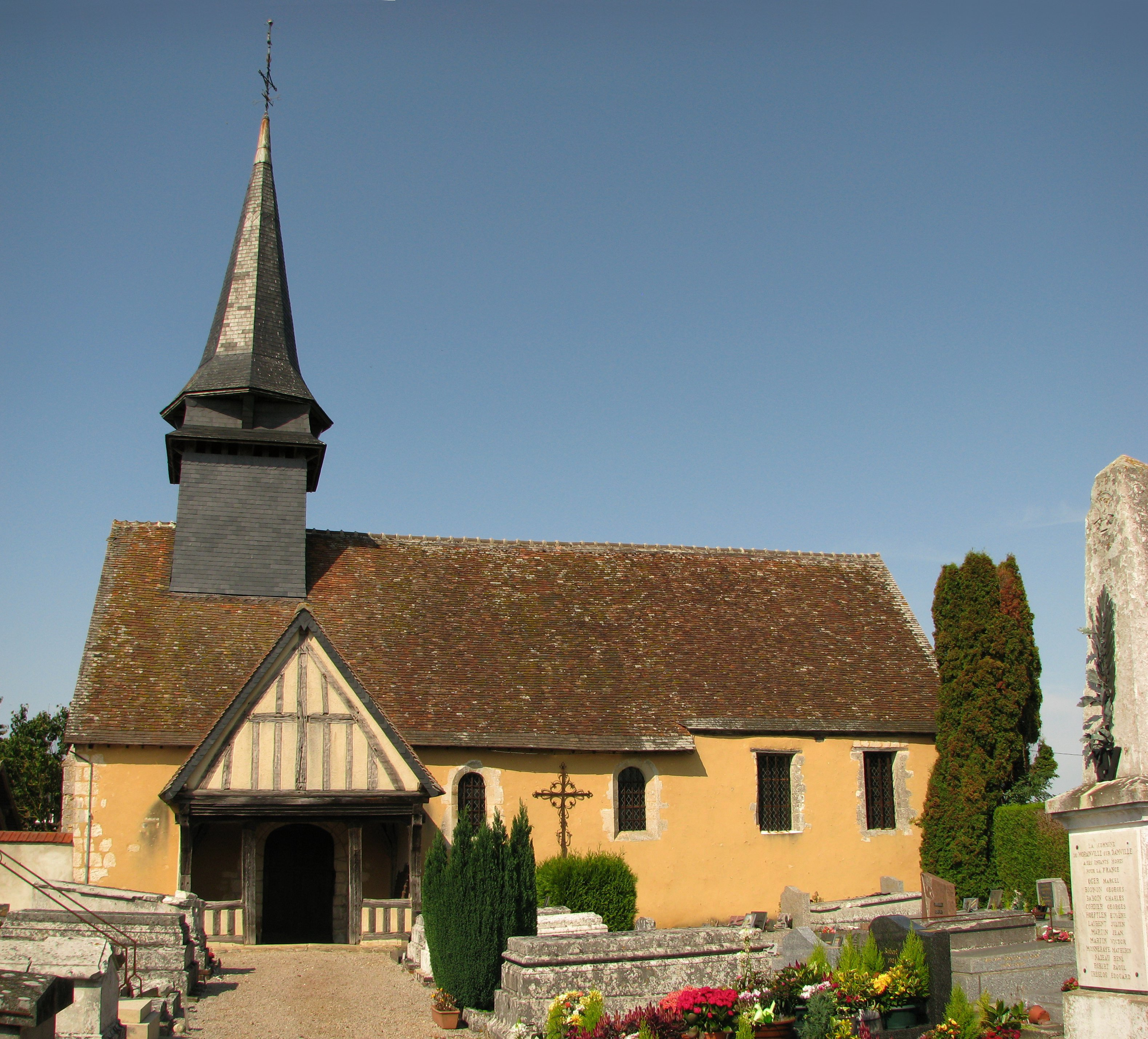
- The church in Buis-sur-Damville

- Coat of arms
- Location of Buis-sur-Damville
- Location within France Location within Normandy
- Coordinates: 48°49′57″N 1°07′21″E
- Country: France
- Region: Normandy
- Department: Eure
- Arrondissement: Bernay
- Canton: Verneuil-sur-Avre
- Commune: Mesnils-sur-Iton
- Area^{1}: 24.56 km^{2} (9.48 sq mi)
- Elevation: 159 m (522 ft)
- Highest elevation: 164 m (538 ft)
- Lowest elevation: 148 m (486 ft)
- Population (2019): 1,008
  - Density: 41.04/km^{2} (106.3/sq mi)
- Time zone: UTC+01:00 (CET)
  - Summer (DST): UTC+02:00 (CEST)
- Postal code: 27240
- ^{1} French Land Register data, which excludes lakes, ponds, glaciers > 1 km^{2} (0.386 sq mi or 247 acres) and river estuaries.

Buis-sur-Damville (French pronunciation: [bɥi syʁ dɑ̃vil], literally Buis on Damville) is a former commune in the Eure department in Normandy in northern France. It was established in 1972 by the merger of the former communes Boissy-sur-Damville, Créton and Morainville-sur-Damville. On 1 January 2019, it was merged into the commune Mesnils-sur-Iton.

== Population ==
Historical population
Year	Pop.	±% p.a.
1975	433	—
1982	522	+2.71%
1990	638	+2.54%
1999	768	+2.08%
2006	864	+1.70%
2019	1,008	+1.19%
Source: EHESS and INSEE

== See also ==
- Communes of the Eure department
