= Grandvilliers =

Grandvilliers is the name of two communes in France:

- Grandvilliers, Eure
- Grandvilliers, Oise
