= Suzanne Duchamp =

French painter (1889–1963)

- Portrait of Suzanne Duchamp, by Man Ray, c. 1926, Paris
- Born: Suzanne Duchamp; 20 October 1889
- Died: 11 September 1963 (aged 73)
- Education: École des Beaux-Arts
- Known for: Painting, Collage
- Notable work: Multiplication Broken and Restored
- Movement: Dada, Tabu
- Spouse: Jean Crotti (m. 1919)

Suzanne Duchamp-Crotti (20 October 1889 – 11 September 1963) was a French Dadaist painter, collagist, sculptor, and draughtsman. Her work was significant to the development of Paris Dada and modernism and her drawings and collages explore fascinating gender dynamics. Because she was a woman in the male-dominated Dada movement, she was rarely considered an artist in her own right. She was constantly overshadowed by her famous older brothers, who were also artists, or was often reduced to being described simply as "the wife of" fellow artist Jean Crotti. Her work in painting turns out to be significantly influential to the landscape of Dada in Paris and to the interests of women in Dada. She took a large role as an avant-garde artist, working through a career that spanned five decades, during a turbulent time of great societal change. She used her work to express certain subject matter such as personal concerns about modern society, her role as a modern woman artist, and the effects of the First World War. Her work often weaves painting, collage, and language together in complex ways.

== Early life and education ==
Suzanne was born in Blainville-Crevon, Seine-Maritime in the Haute-Normandie Region of France, near Rouen. She was the fourth of six children born into the artistic family of Justin Isidore (Eugène) Duchamp (1848–1925) and Marie Caroline Lucie Duchamp (née Nicolle) (1860–1925), the daughter of painter and engraver Émile Frédéric Nicolle.

Suzanne Duchamp-Crotti was the younger sister of famous artists Jacques Villon (né Émile Méry Frédéric Gaston Duchamp), a painter and printmaker, Raymond Duchamp-Villon, a sculptor, and Marcel Duchamp, a painter, sculptor and author. She was closest in age and temperament to Marcel Duchamp, forming and maintaining a close bond and emotional attachment with him throughout their lives. Scholars, such as Arturo Schwarz, have speculated that there may have been an incestuous relationship between the two, although that was influenced by Freudian school of thought at the time.

She began her studies as a painter at the École des Beaux-Arts in her native Rouen when she was sixteen years old in 1905. Her early works reflected styles ranging from Intimism and Fauvism to Impressionism and a conservative Cubism, often depicting family and childhood scenes around Rouen. From 1909–1910, Marcel and Suzanne participated together in the activities of the Société Normande de Peinture Moderne, an artists' group based in Rouen. Through this group, she was exposed to avant-garde trends. At age 21, in 1911, she married a local pharmacist named Charles Desmares but quickly divorced, moving to Paris to serve as a nurse during the First World War, living in Marcel's apartment in rue la Condamine. She worked in the Hôtel des Invalides, one of the largest French military hospitals. During this time, she continued to work as an artist, establishing a presence in the Parisian quarter of Montparnasse and often asking Marcel for feedback or advice.

== Early work ==
Broken and Restored Multiplication, 1918

In late 1915, Suzanne went to clear out Marcel's studio in Paris and this is when/where she first learned about his readymades. Between 1916 and 1921 she produced a significant body of work in a formal language that has come to be called 'mechanomorphic' - images taken from commonplace mechanical or technological objects arranged to describe or infer human agency, desire or behavior. The work of Francis Picabia typifies the mechanomorphic tendency. In a letter to her written in January 1916, Marcel elaborated on his concept of the ready-mades and mentioned the Bicycle Wheel and the Bottlerack which she should have encountered in the studio. He asked her to complete one of them by adding the inscription "d'après Marcel Duchamp," which translates to "after Marcel Duchamp." This collaboration with Marcel exhibited his trust in Suzanne about her openness towards radical art production.

In 1916, Suzanne met Jean Crotti, an artist who worked in the same studio as Marcel. During this time is when her first surge of activity occurred, creating some of her best work. She produced "Un et une menacés," "A Threatened Male and Female" which references mechanical symbolism as well as real machine parts, which greatly lends itself to the Dadaist movement. One of her most noteworthy works is Multiplication Broken and Restored, completed in 1919. The composition contains Dadaist imagery with man-made objects such as a tower and cityscape. It is also believed that this piece comes directly from her private experience rather than being a severe critique of cultural norms.

After the war ended, Suzanne and Jean married in Paris in 1919. As a wedding present, Marcel sent them instructions for a readymade which involved suspending a geometry textbook on the porch and letting the wind and rain gradually tear it apart.

During this time, Dada was gaining traction in Paris due to figures like Tristan Tzara. Jean and Suzanne were not very involved until 1921, but both exhibited three works in the prestigious Salon des Indèpendants, alongside artists such as Francis Picabia. The art emphasized was that of the provocative mechanomorphic style. After this, Suzanne continued to work on her dadaist oeuvre, creating more delicate watercolor or gouache paintings. One of these paintings is "Marcel's Unhappy Readymade," depicting the geometry textbook she received from him as a gift. Interestingly, Suzanne inverted the painting so that it was presented upside down.

Completed in 1920, her work Ariette of Oblivion in the Thoughtless Chapel is regarded as the strongest Dadaist work that she created with seemingly nonsense inscriptions and mechanical imagery. However, much like Multiplication Broken and Restored, the inspiration for this piece emerged from the devotion she experienced in her relationship. This personal perspective runs contrary to the Dada sentiment of criticizing social conventions and undermining culture.

In 1921, Jean and Suzanne signed, along with 20 other artists, the Dada souléve tout, a manifesto created by Tristan Tzara to rebuke the increasingly fascist Italian Futurist, Marinetti. In April 1921, she exhibited with Crotti at the Tabu exhibition the Salon d'Autonme, (at the Galerie Montaigne in Paris); this was a few weeks before the Dada Salon at the same location. In later years, Duchamp and Crotti moved further away from Dada calling their work 'Tabu'. The Tabu pieces were more geometric and abstract, seeking certain universal tropes, but still reveal a highly personalized symbolic language. Tabu works drew on a range of domestic or everyday issues, simplified and combined in often striking ways. These works never brought the acclaim of Duchamp's earlier mechanomorphic pieces and are not discussed widely in literature on the artist.

== Later life ==
Throughout her life, Suzanne continued to participate in exhibitions, such as the "Femmes Peintures Français" exhibition at Galerie Barbazanges, organized by women artists wanting recognition in the art world. She also exhibited along with Marie Laurencin in "Les Femmes Artistes d'Europe" at the Musée du Jeu de Paume in 1937.

In 1945, after the war, Suzanne Duchamp became a member of the Union des Femmes Peintres et Sculpteurs and regularly exhibited landscapes, portraits, and flower still lifes at its salons.

In 1967, in Rouen, France, her brother Marcel helped organize an exhibition called Les Duchamp: Jacques Villon, Raymond Duchamp-Villon, Marcel Duchamp, Suzanne Duchamp. Some of this family exhibition was later shown at the Musée National d'Art Moderne in Paris.

She died in Neuilly-sur-Seine (Seine-Saint-Denis), France in 1963, within a month of being diagnosed with a brain tumor.

== Bibliography ==
- Hemus, Ruth. Dada's Women. New Haven & London: Yale University Press, 2009.
- Tomkins, Calvin, Duchamp: A Biography. Henry Holt and Company, Inc., 1996. ISBN 0-8050-5789-7
