= Raymond Duchamp-Villon =

French sculptor (1876–1918)

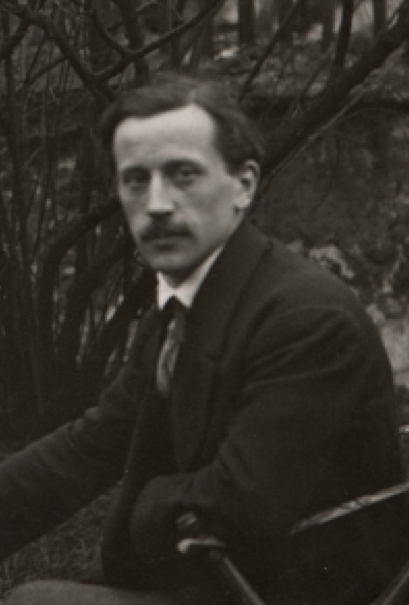
- Portrait, Smithsonian Institution Archives of American Art, c. 1913
- Born: Pierre-Maurice-Raymond Duchamp; 5 November 1876; Damville, Eure, France
- Died: 9 October 1918 (aged 41); Cannes, France
- Known for: Sculpture
- Notable work: The Large Horse (1914); La Maison Cubiste facade (1912)
- Movement: Cubism

Raymond Duchamp-Villon (5 November 1876 – 9 October 1918) was a French sculptor.

== Life and art ==
Duchamp-Villon was born Pierre-Maurice-Raymond Duchamp in Damville, Eure, in the Normandy region of France, the second son of Eugène and Lucie Duchamp (née Nicolle), the daughter of painter and engraver Émile Frédéric Nicolle. Of the six Duchamp children, four would become successful artists. He was the brother of Jacques Villon (1875–1963), painter, printmaker; Marcel Duchamp (1887–1968), painter, sculptor and author; Suzanne Duchamp-Crotti (1889–1963), painter. Duchamp-Villon inherited his love for art from his mother.

From 1894 to 1898 Raymond Duchamp-Villon lived in the Montmartre Quarter of Paris with his brother Jacques and studied medicine at the Sorbonne. Rheumatic fever forced him to abandon his studies in 1898 and it left him partially incapacitated for a time. This unforeseen event altered the course of his life as he began to pursue an interest in sculpture. He started by creating small statuettes and essentially became self-taught, achieving a high level of mastery and acumen. In 1902 and 1903, he exhibited at the Salon de la Société Nationale des Beaux-Arts but to distinguish himself from his artist brother, he began to use the Duchamp-Villon designation on all his works.

In 1905 Duchamp-Villon had his first exhibition at the Salon d'Automne and a show at the Galerie Legrip in Rouen with his brother Jacques. Two years later they moved to the village of Puteaux on the outskirts of Paris where the three Duchamp brothers were part of the regular meetings of what became known as the Section d'Or, involving artists, poets and critics. Raymond's reputation was such that he was made a member of the jury of the sculpture section of the Salon d'Automne in 1907 and was later instrumental in promoting the Cubist movement.

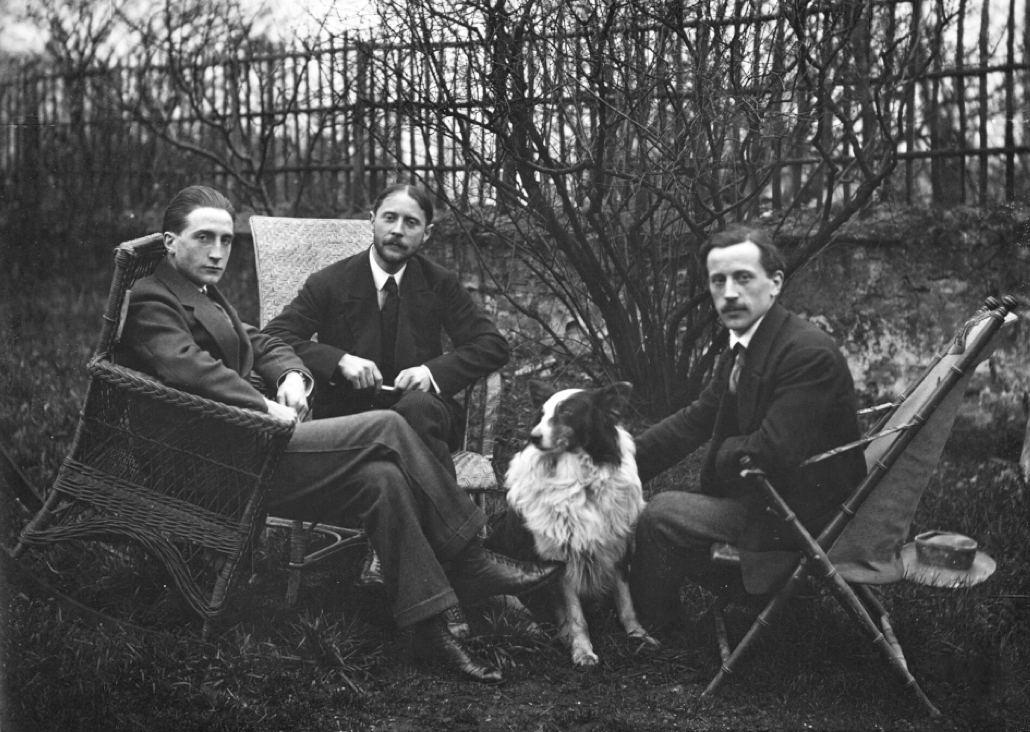
Three Duchamp brothers, left to right: Marcel Duchamp, Jacques Villon, and Raymond Duchamp-Villon in the garden of Jacques Villon's studio in Puteaux, France, 1914, (Smithsonian Institution collections.)

In 1911 he exhibited at the Galerie de l'Art Contemporain in Paris and the following year his work was included in a show organized by the Duchamp brothers at the Salon de la Section d'Or at the Galerie de la Boétie. All three of the Duchamp brothers then showed their work at the 1913 Armory Show in New York City that helped introduce modern art to the United States.

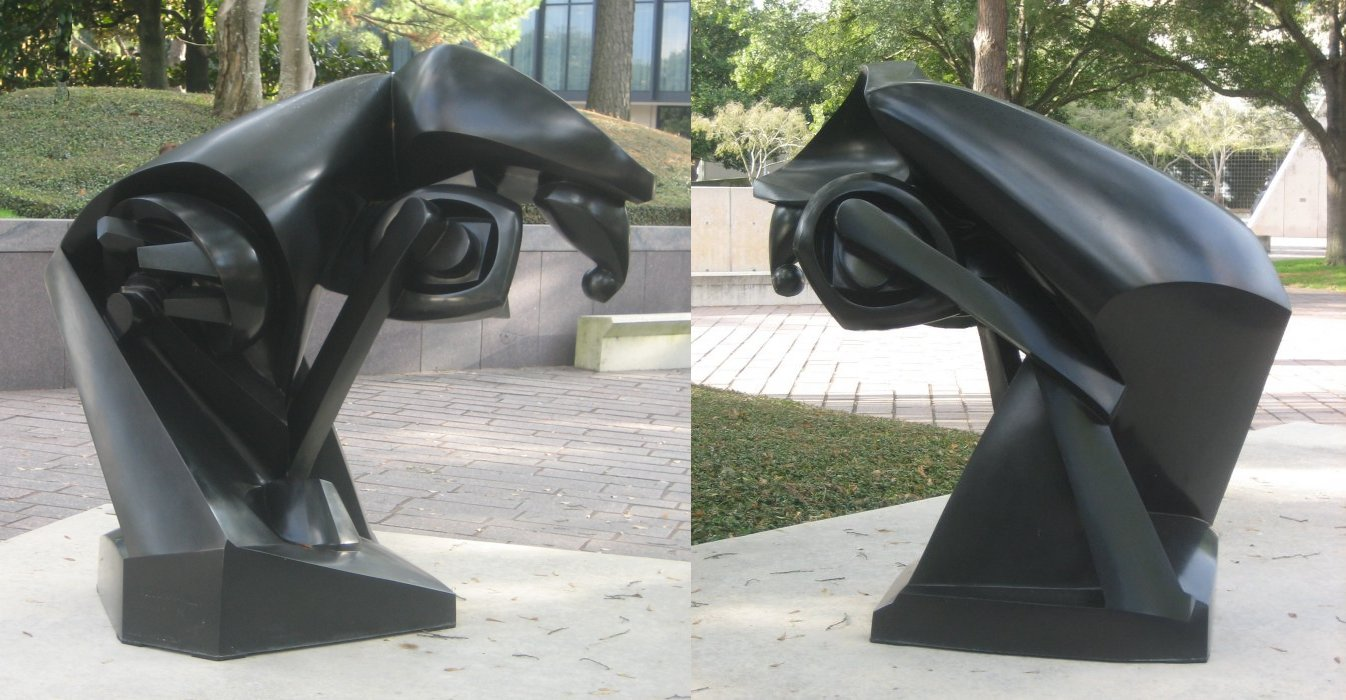
Raymond Duchamp-Villon, 1914, The Large Horse, bronze, 1914 (two views), Museum of Fine Arts, Houston

In 1913 he took part in exhibitions at the Galerie André Groult in Paris, the Galerie S. V. U. Mánes in Prague, and in 1914 at Der Sturm Gallery in Berlin. During World War I Raymond Duchamp-Villon served in the French army in a medical capacity, but still worked on his major cubist sculpture, The Large Horse.

In late 1916, Raymond Duchamp-Villon contracted typhoid fever while stationed at the military quarters in Champagne. As a result, he was taken to the military hospital at Cannes where he died.

In 1967, in Rouen, his last surviving artist brother Marcel helped organize an exhibition called Les Duchamp: Jacques Villon, Raymond Duchamp-Villon, Marcel Duchamp, Suzanne Duchamp. Some of this family exhibition was later shown at the Musée National d'Art Moderne in Paris.

== Gallery ==
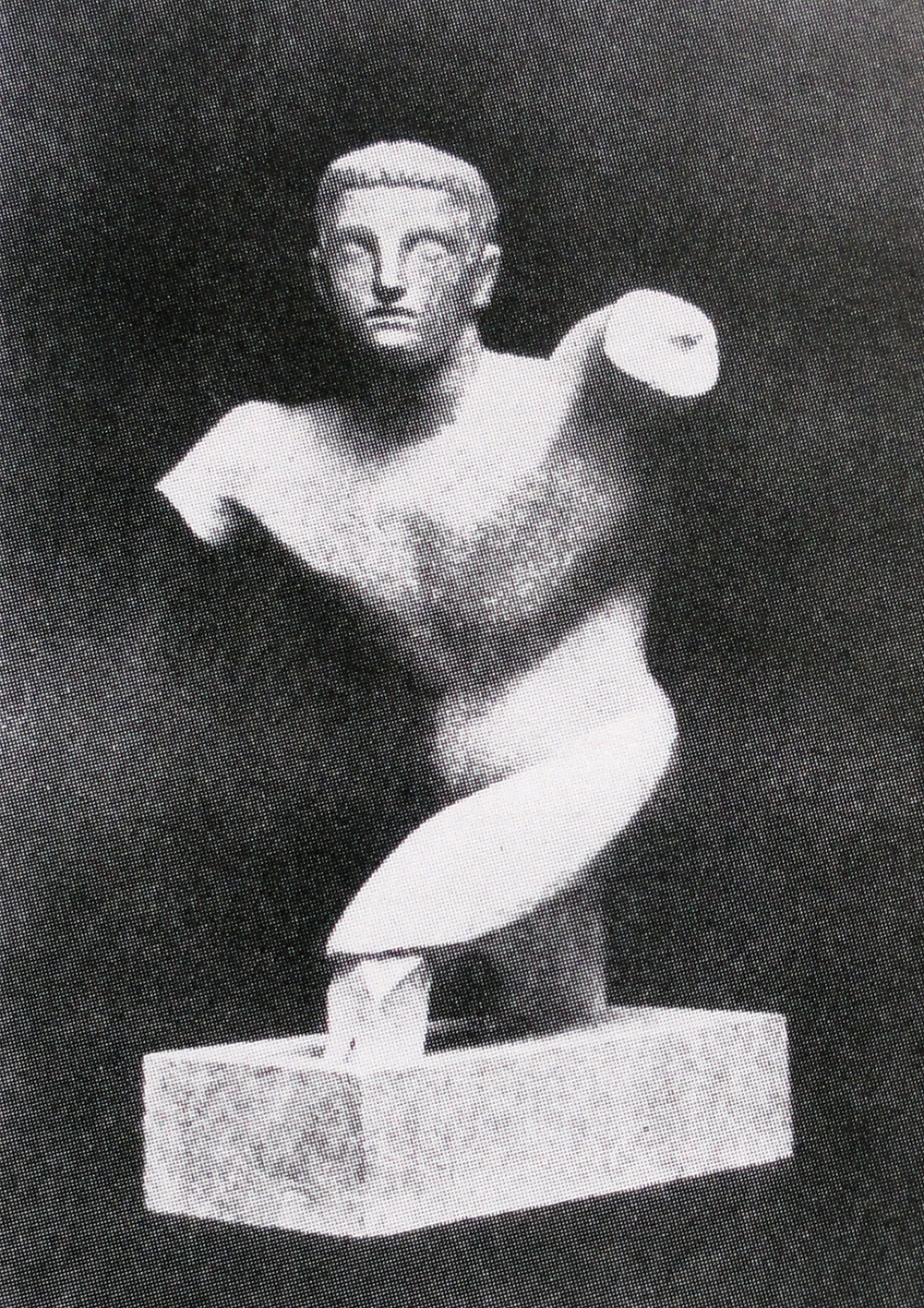
1910, Torse de jeune homme (Torso of a young man), terracotta, Armory Show postcard, published 1913
Solomon R. Guggenheim Museum
New York City

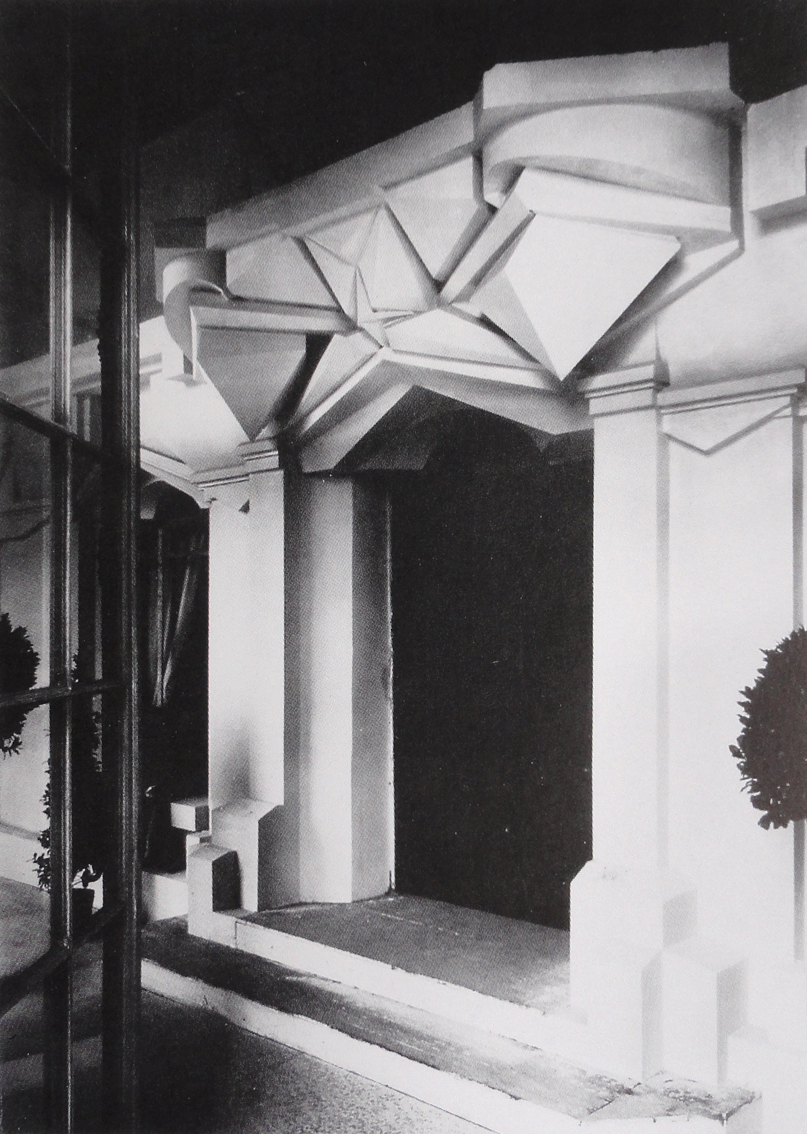
La Maison Cubiste (Cubist House) at the Salon d'Automne, 1912, detail of the entrance. Photograph by Duchamp-Villon

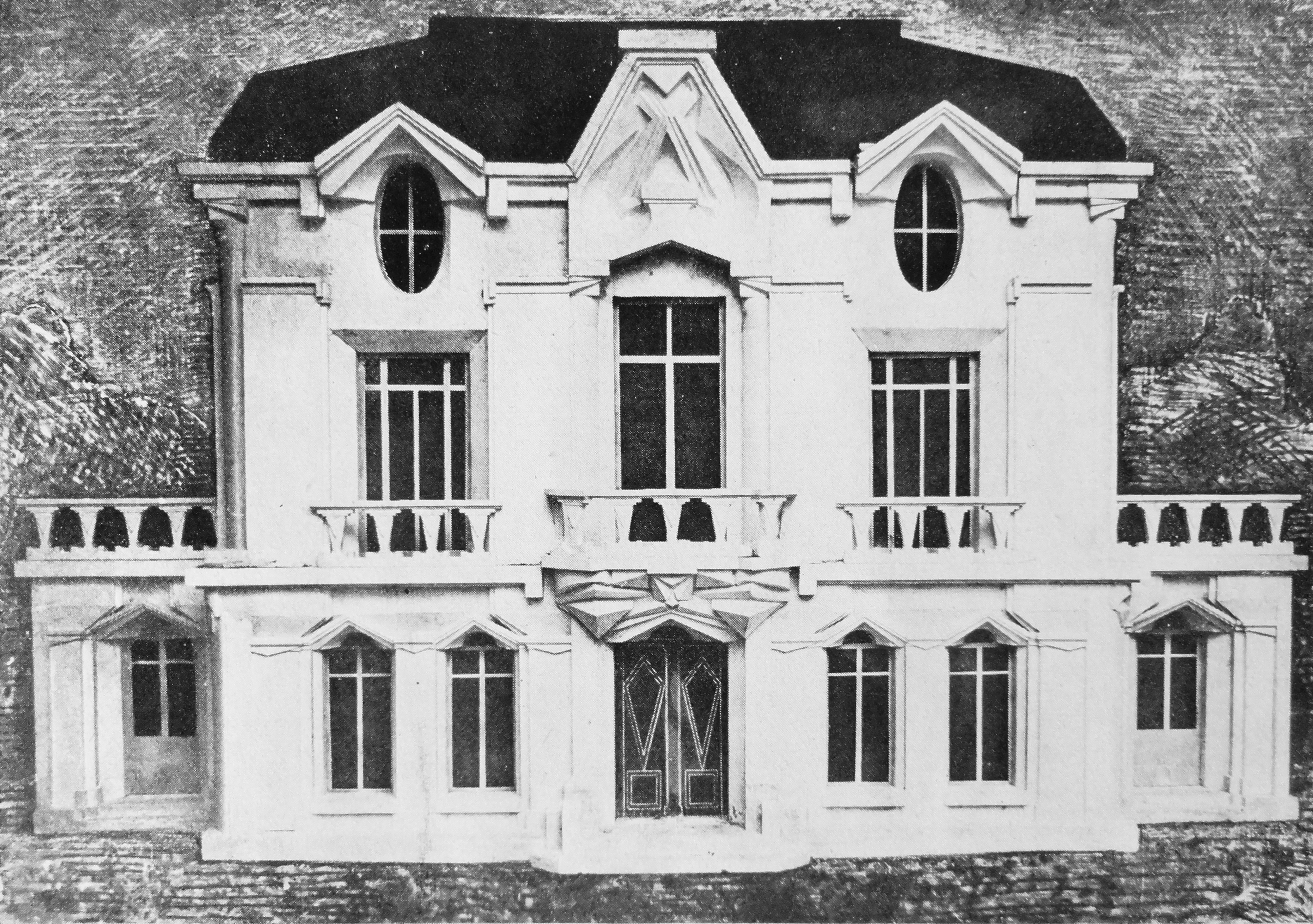
Study for La Maison Cubiste, Projet d'Hotel (Cubist House) (Projet d'hôtel, Maquette de la façade de la Maison Cubiste (Cubist House)) reproduced in Les Peintres Cubistes, 1913 Image published in Les Peintres Cubistes, by Guillaume Apollinaire, 17 March 1913

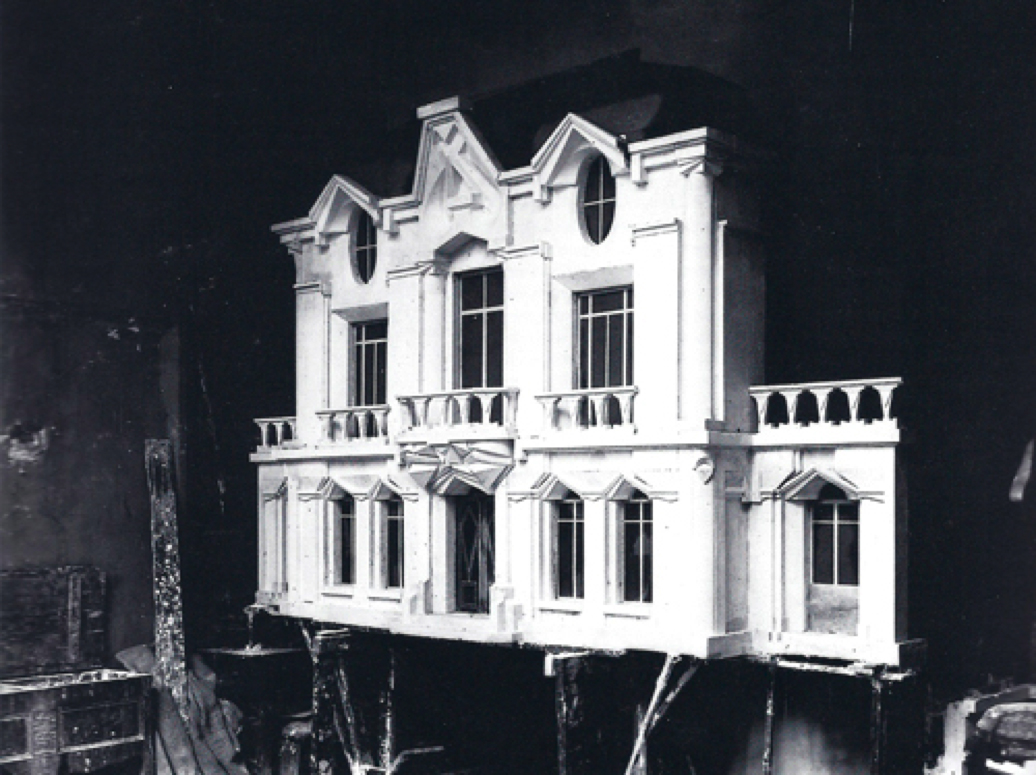
1912, Maquette originale de La Maison Cubiste (Cubist House, Façade architecturale), Document from Musée National d'Art Moderne, Paris

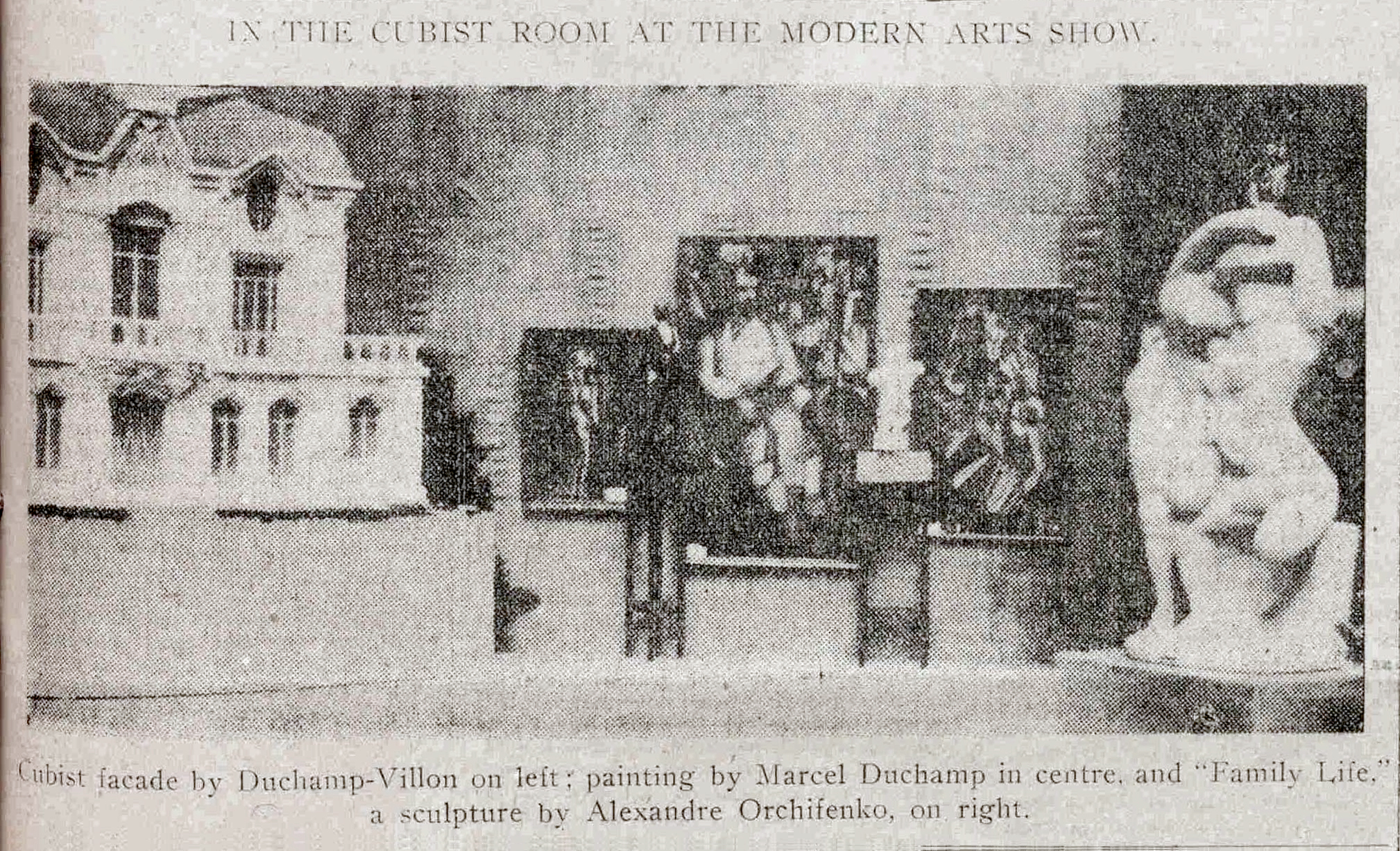
Installation shot of the Cubist room, 1913 Armory Show, published in the New York Tribune, February 17, 1913 (p. 7).

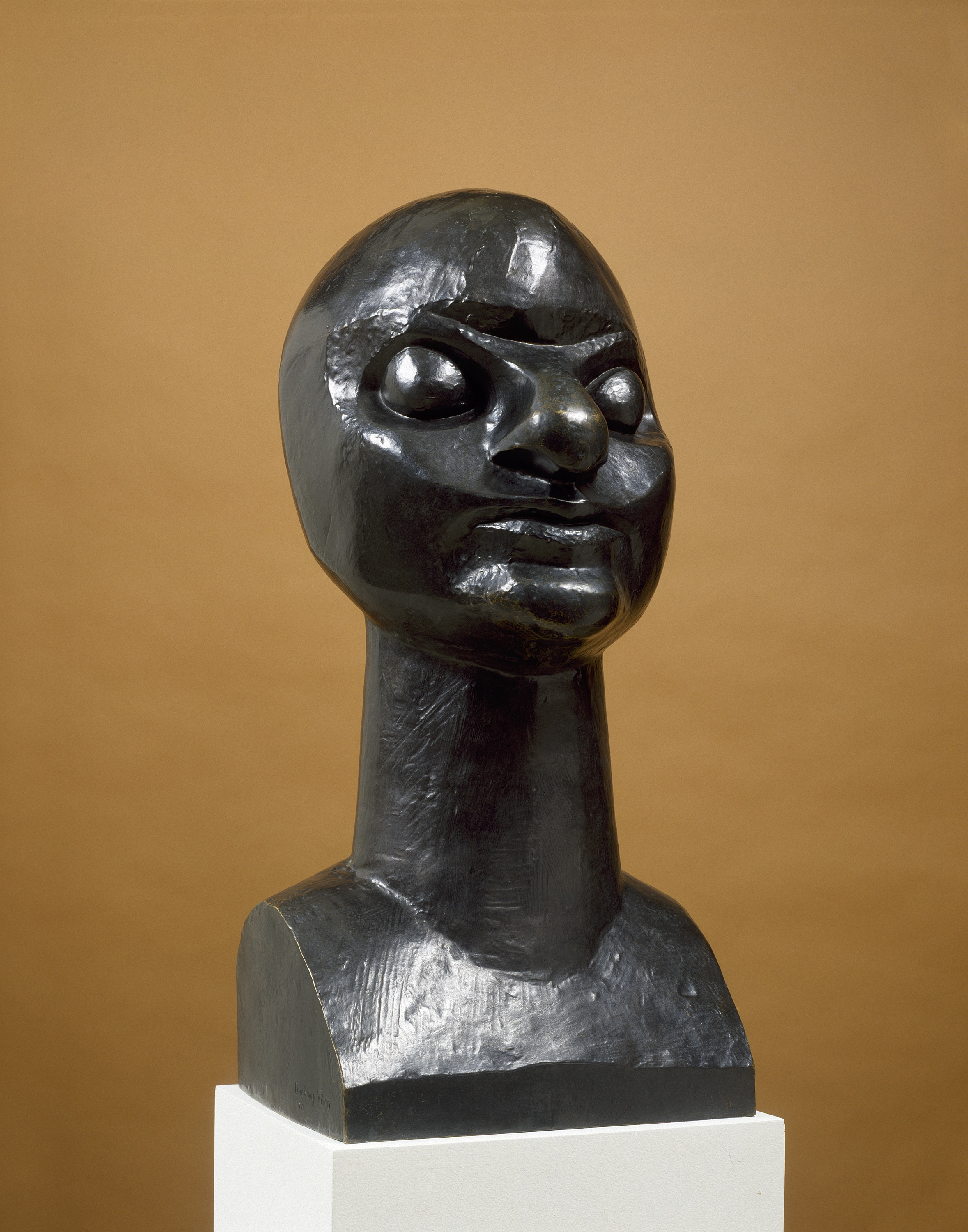
(cast 1954), Maggy (Maggy), bronze, 1912.
Solomon R. Guggenheim Museum
New York City

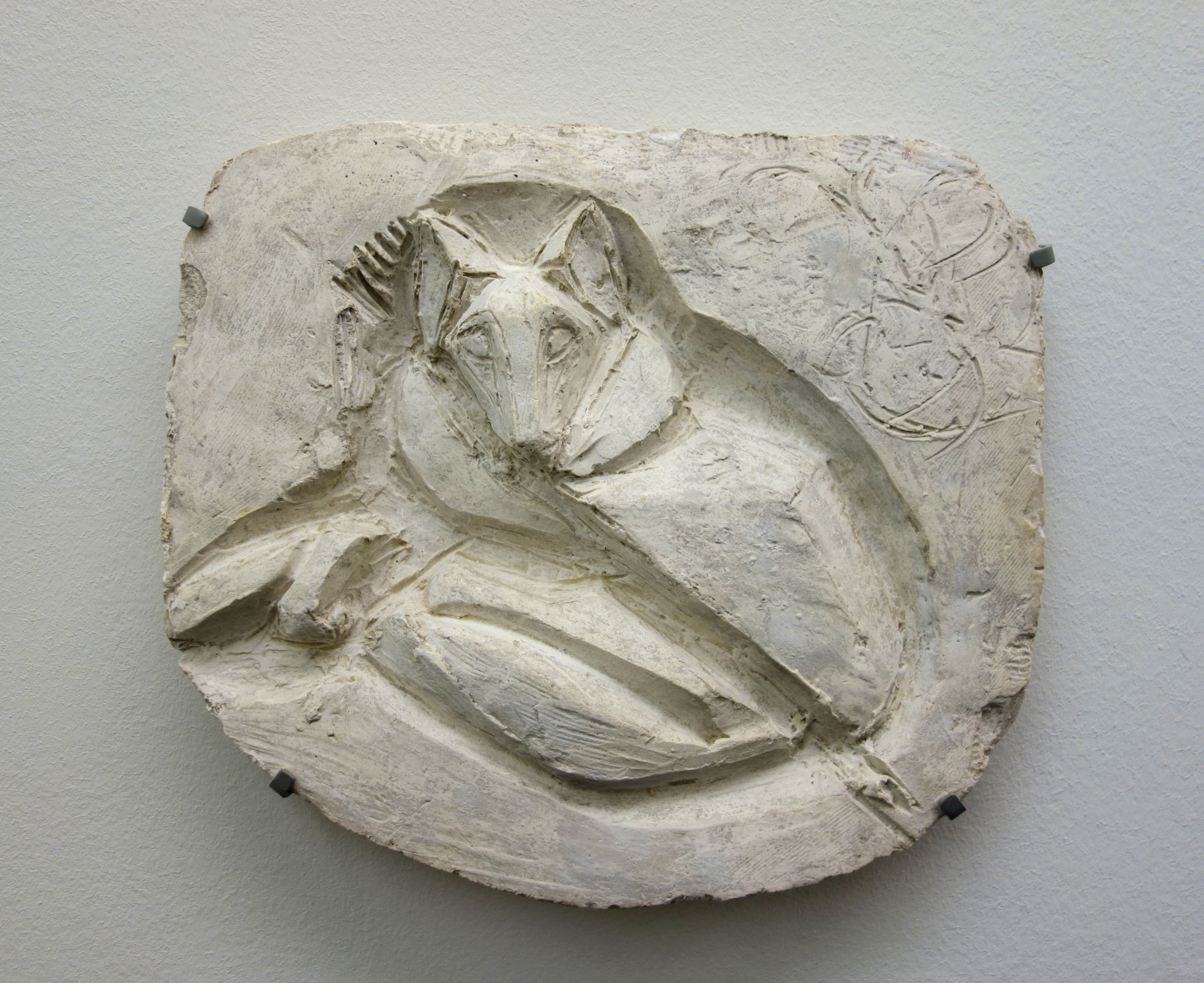
Le chien, 1913.

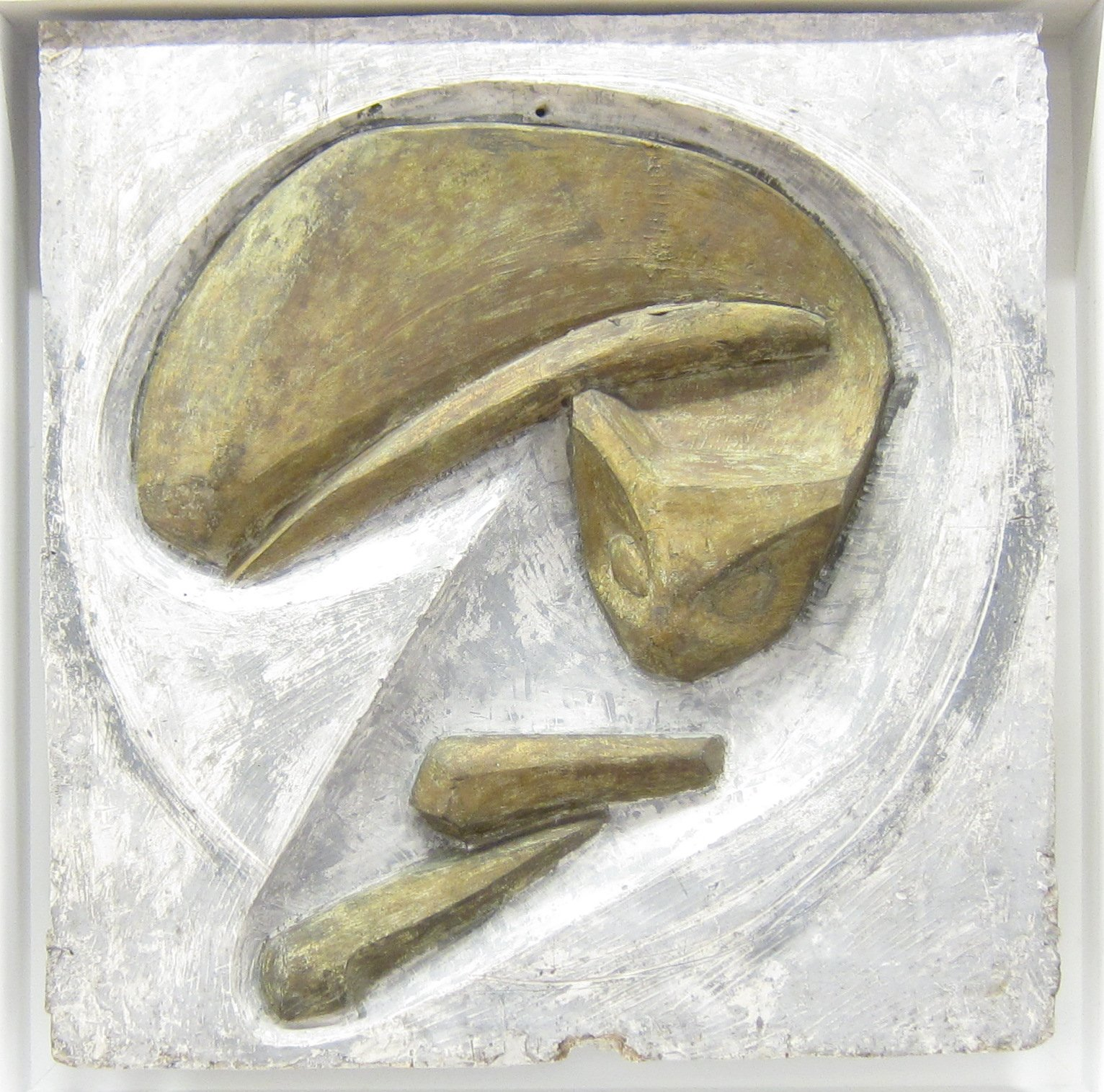
Le chat 1913.

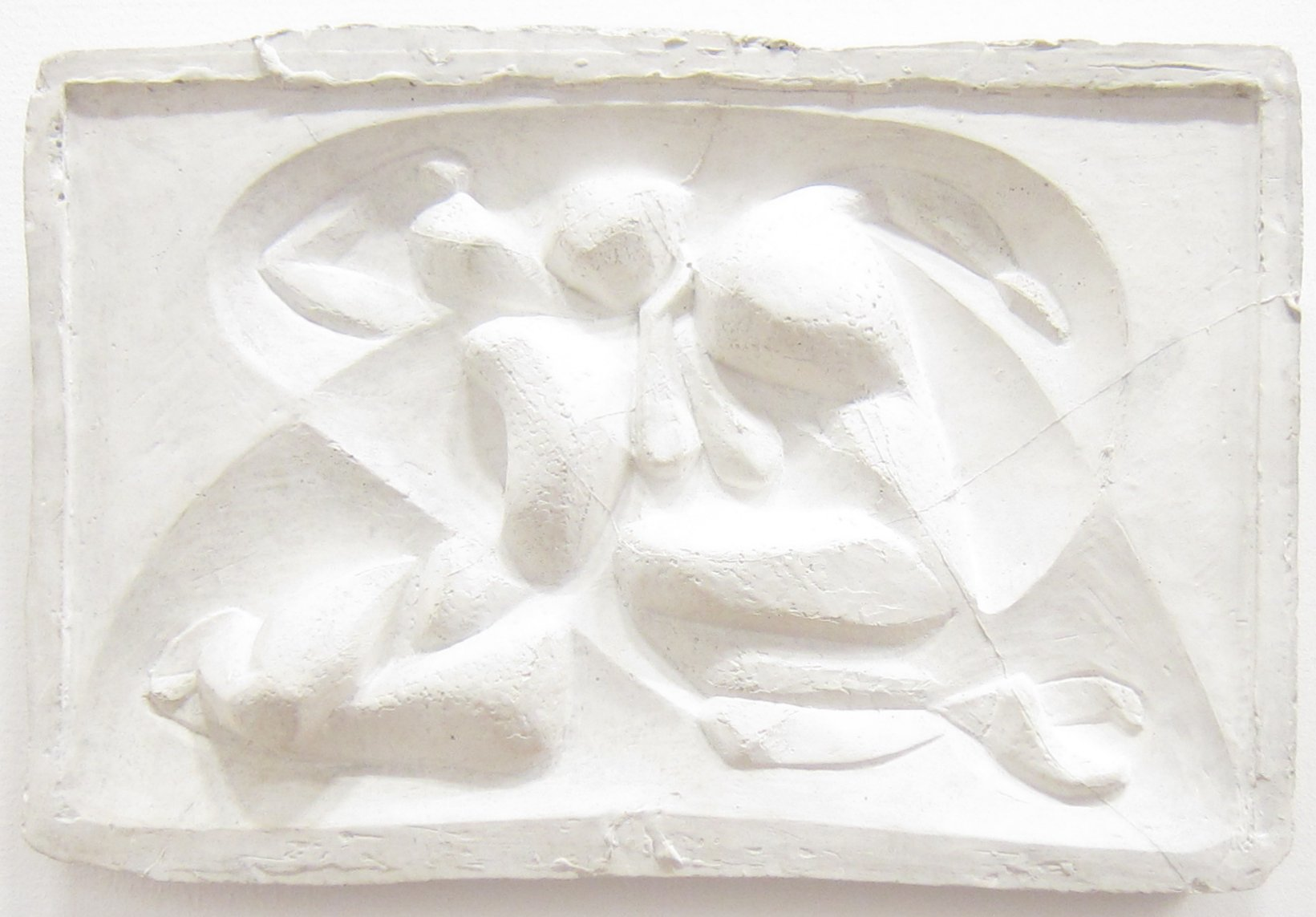
Les amants II, 1913. Musée National d'Art Moderne, Paris

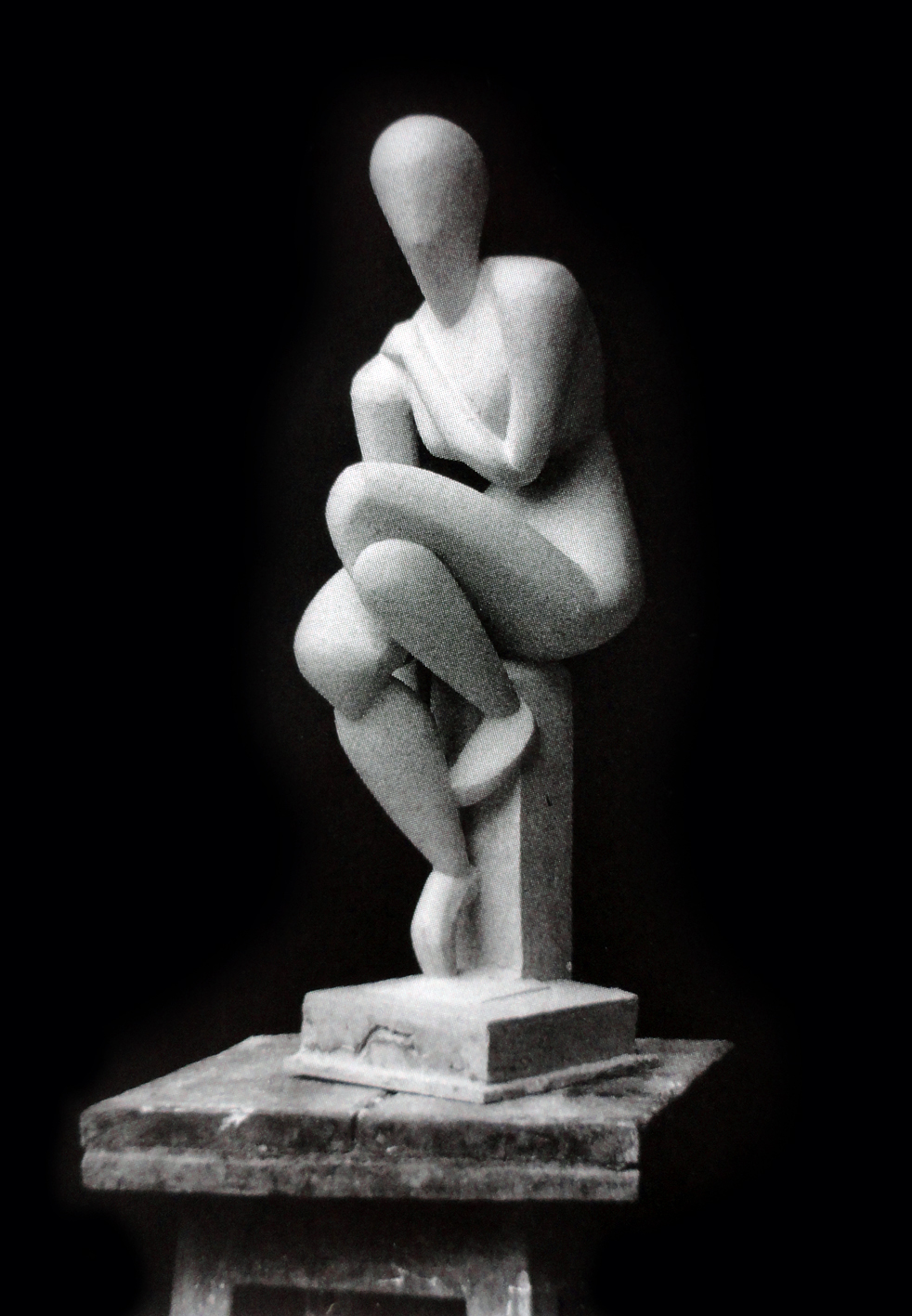
Femme assise, plaster, 65.5 cm (25.75 in), 1914. Photograph by Duchamp-Villon

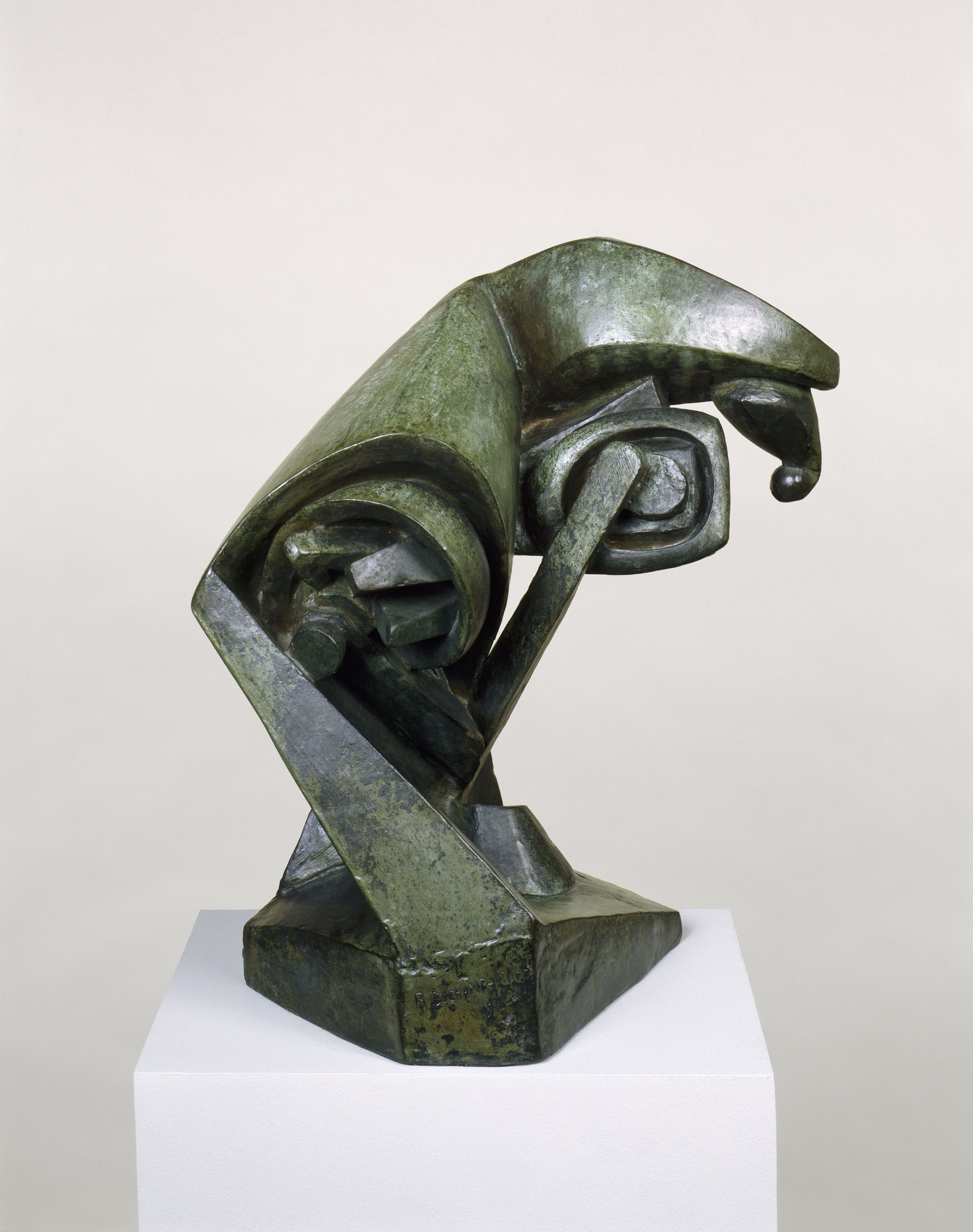
ca. 1930 cast of Le cheval (The Horse), bronze and patina
Solomon R. Guggenheim Museum
New York City

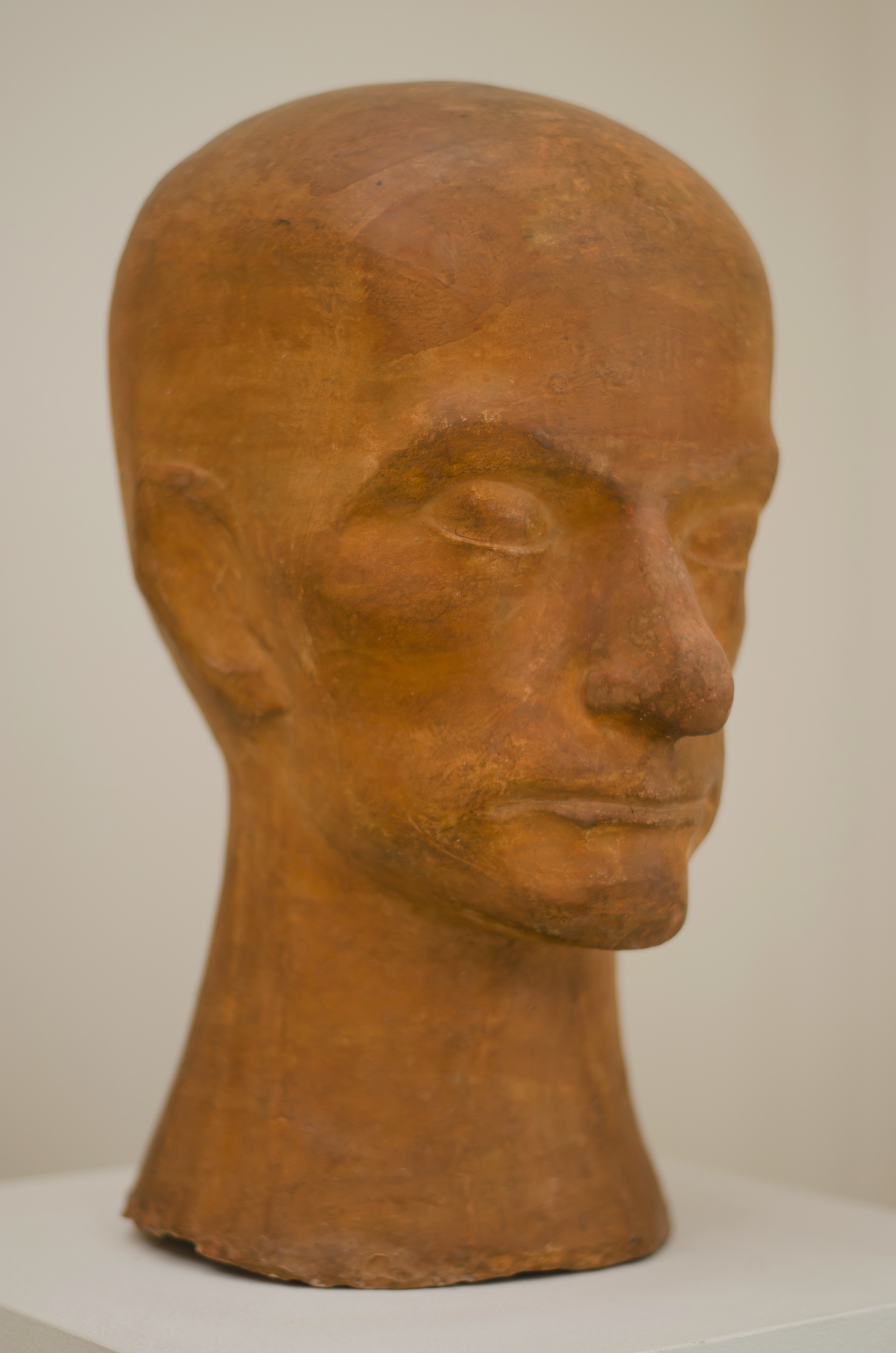
Baudelaire, 1912

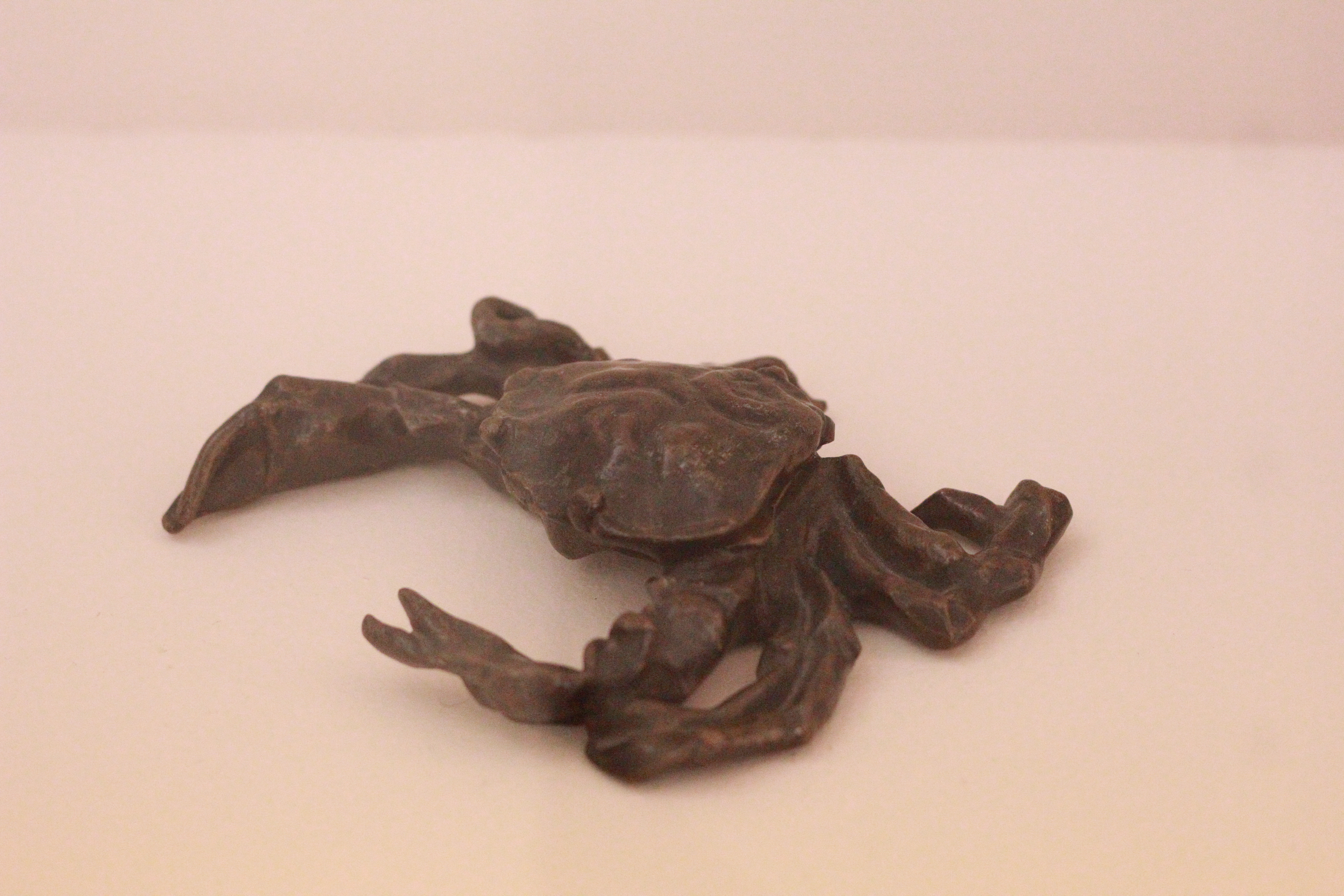
Encrier, 1918

=== Publications ===
- Tomkins, Calvin, Duchamp: A Biography. Henry Holt and Company, Inc., 1996. ISBN 0-8050-5789-7

== See also ==
- Cubism
- La Maison Cubiste
