= Gouville =

- Part of Mesnils-sur-Iton
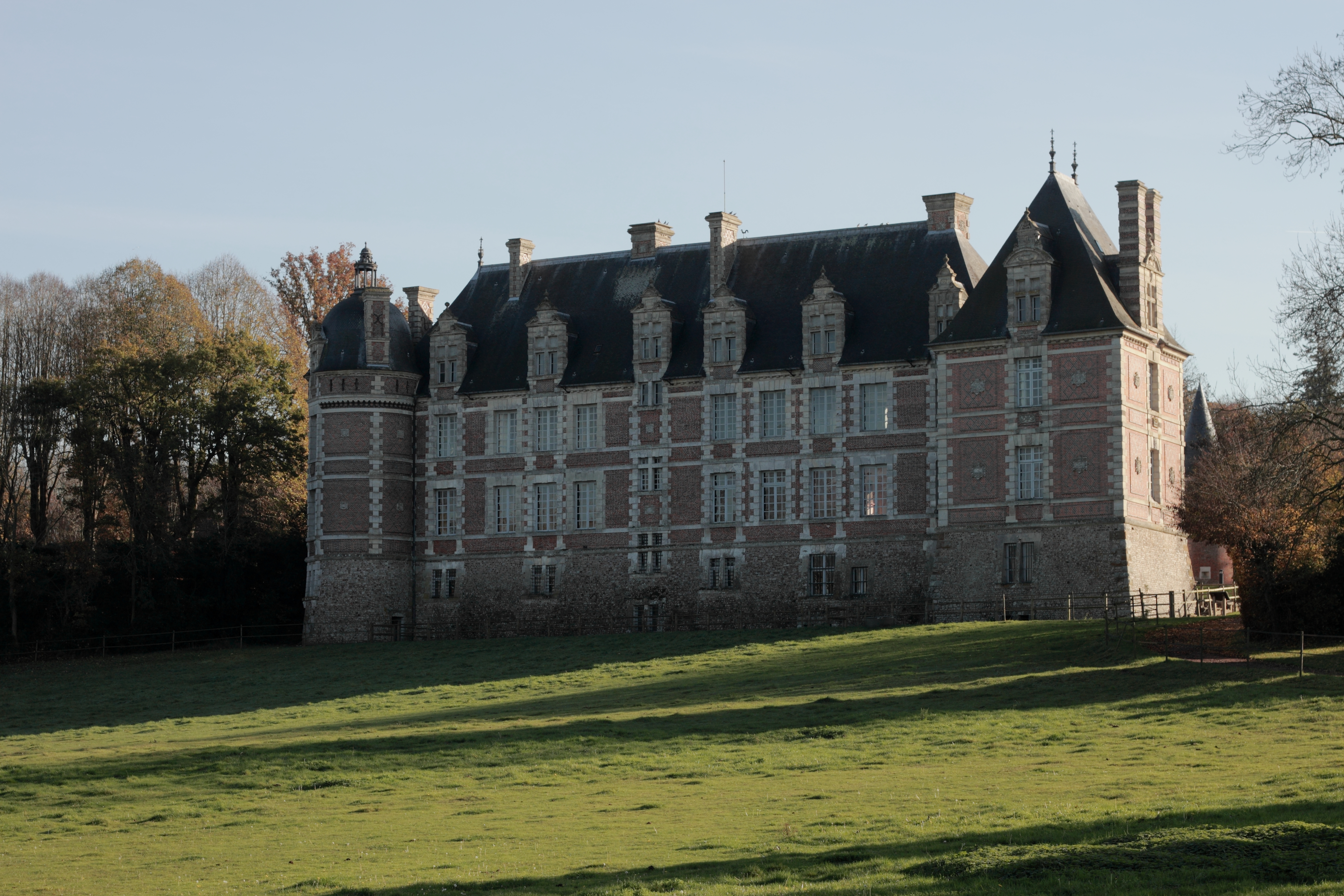
- Chateau of Chambray
- Location of Gouville
- Location within France Location within Normandy
- Coordinates: 48°51′05″N 0°59′32″E
- Country: France
- Region: Normandy
- Department: Eure
- Arrondissement: Bernay
- Canton: Verneuil-sur-Avre
- Commune: Mesnils-sur-Iton
- Area^{1}: 8.47 km^{2} (3.27 sq mi)
- Elevation: 169 m (554 ft)
- Highest elevation: 180 m (590 ft)
- Lowest elevation: 140 m (460 ft)
- Population (2013): 545
  - Density: 64.3/km^{2} (167/sq mi)
- Time zone: UTC+01:00 (CET)
  - Summer (DST): UTC+02:00 (CEST)
- Postal code: 27240
- ^{1} French Land Register data, which excludes lakes, ponds, glaciers > 1 km^{2} (0.386 sq mi or 247 acres) and river estuaries.

Gouville (French pronunciation: [ɡuvil]) is a former commune in the Eure department in northern France. On 1 January 2016, it was merged into the new commune of Mesnils-sur-Iton.

== Population ==
Historical population
Year	Pop.	±% p.a.
1962	168	—
1968	253	+7.06%
1975	300	+2.46%
1982	240	−3.14%
1990	300	+2.83%
1999	287	−0.49%
2006	481	+7.66%
2013	545	+1.80%
Source: EHESS and INSEE

== Notable people ==
- Alfred-Alexandre Delauney (1830–1894), painter and engraver

== See also ==
- Communes of the Eure department
