= Le Roncenay-Authenay =

- Part of Mesnils-sur-Iton
- Location of Le Roncenay-Authenay
- Location within France Location within Normandy
- Coordinates: 48°51′35″N 1°02′48″E
- Country: France
- Region: Normandy
- Department: Eure
- Arrondissement: Bernay
- Canton: Verneuil-sur-Avre
- Commune: Mesnils-sur-Iton
- Area^{1}: 8.79 km^{2} (3.39 sq mi)
- Elevation: 158 m (518 ft)
- Highest elevation: 171 m (561 ft)
- Lowest elevation: 132 m (433 ft)
- Population (2013): 379
  - Density: 43.1/km^{2} (112/sq mi)
- Time zone: UTC+01:00 (CET)
  - Summer (DST): UTC+02:00 (CEST)
- Postal code: 27240
- ^{1} French Land Register data, which excludes lakes, ponds, glaciers > 1 km^{2} (0.386 sq mi or 247 acres) and river estuaries.

Le Roncenay-Authenay (French pronunciation: [lə ʁɔ̃snɛ otnɛ]) is a former commune in the Eure department in northern France. On 1 January 2016, it was merged into the new commune of Mesnils-sur-Iton.

== See also ==
- Communes of the Eure department
