= Roman, Eure =

Roman
- Part of Mesnils-sur-Iton
- Coat of arms
- Location of Roman
- Location within France Location within Normandy
- Coordinates: 48°50′47″N 1°02′47″E
- Country: France
- Region: Normandy
- Department: Eure
- Arrondissement: Bernay
- Canton: Verneuil-sur-Avre
- Commune: Mesnils-sur-Iton
- Area^{1}: 15.2 km^{2} (5.9 sq mi)
- Elevation: 152 m (499 ft)
- Highest elevation: 172 m (564 ft)
- Lowest elevation: 137 m (449 ft)
- Population (2019): 270
  - Density: 18/km^{2} (46/sq mi)
- Time zone: UTC+01:00 (CET)
  - Summer (DST): UTC+02:00 (CEST)
- Postal code: 27240
- ^{1} French Land Register data, which excludes lakes, ponds, glaciers > 1 km^{2} (0.386 sq mi or 247 acres) and river estuaries.

Roman (French pronunciation: [ʁɔmɑ̃]) is a former commune in the Eure department in northern France. On 1 January 2019, it was merged into the commune Mesnils-sur-Iton.

== See also ==
- Communes of the Eure department
