= Nanteuil-sur-Marne =

- Commune
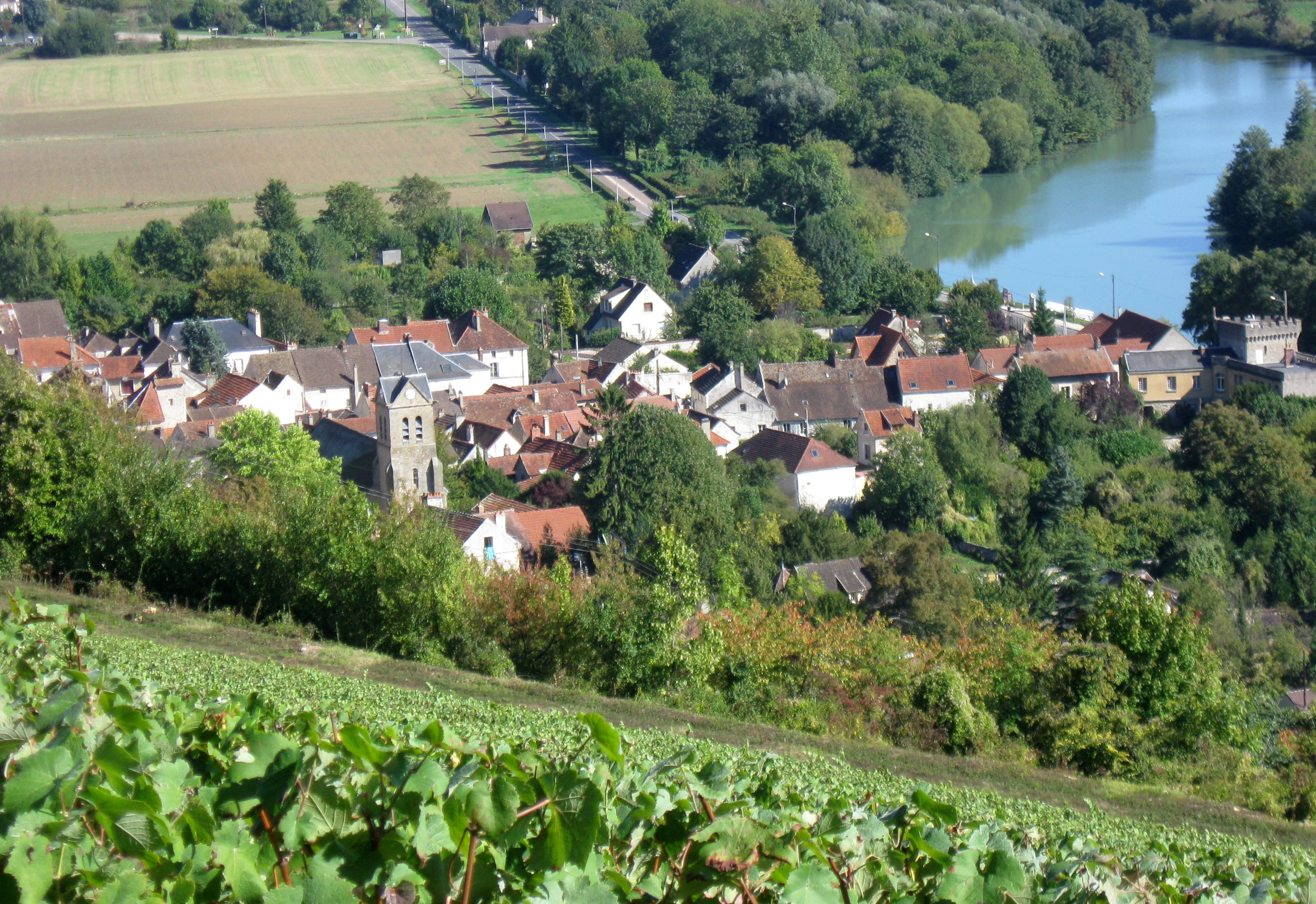
- A general view of Nanteuil-sur-Marne

- Coat of arms
- Location of Nanteuil-sur-Marne
- Location within France Location within Île-de-France (region)
- Coordinates: 48°58′42″N 3°13′16″E
- Country: France
- Region: Île-de-France
- Department: Seine-et-Marne
- Arrondissement: Meaux
- Canton: La Ferté-sous-Jouarre
- Intercommunality: CA Coulommiers Pays de Brie

Government
  - Mayor (2020–2026): Emmanuel Vivet
- Area^{1}: 1.25 km^{2} (0.48 sq mi)
- Highest elevation: 188 m (617 ft)
- Lowest elevation: 53 m (174 ft)
- Population (2023): 406
  - Density: 325/km^{2} (841/sq mi)
- Time zone: UTC+01:00 (CET)
  - Summer (DST): UTC+02:00 (CEST)
- INSEE/Postal code: 77331 /77730
- ^{1} French Land Register data, which excludes lakes, ponds, glaciers > 1 km^{2} (0.386 sq mi or 247 acres) and river estuaries.

Nanteuil-sur-Marne (French pronunciation: [nɑ̃tœj syʁ maʁn], literally Nanteuil on Marne) is a commune in the Seine-et-Marne department in the Île-de-France region in north-central France.

== Demographics ==
Inhabitants are called Nanteuillais.

== Notable people ==
- Alfred-Alexandre Delauney (1830–1894), painter and engraver

== See also ==
- Communes of the Seine-et-Marne department
