= Mesnils-sur-Iton =

- Commune
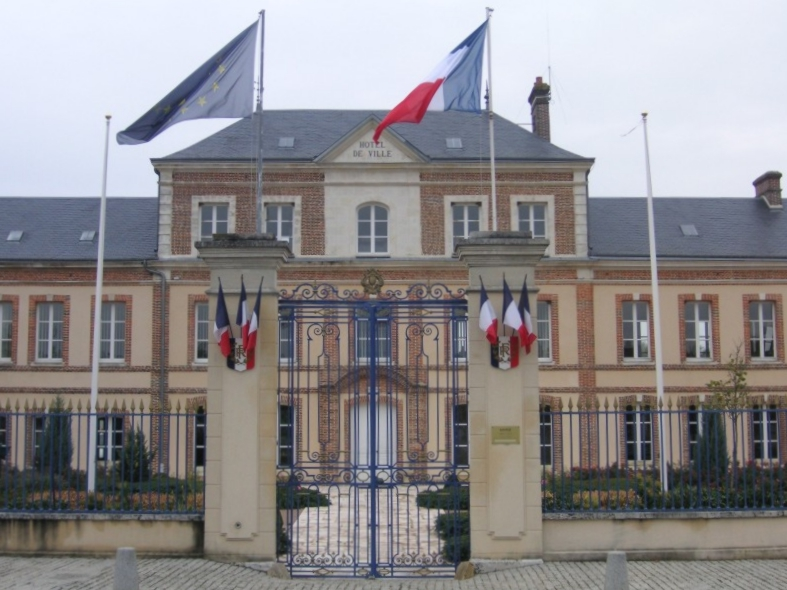
- The town hall in Mesnils-sur-Iton
- Location of Mesnils-sur-Iton
- Location within France Location within Normandy
- Coordinates: 48°52′16″N 1°04′30″E
- Country: France
- Region: Normandy
- Department: Eure
- Arrondissement: Bernay
- Canton: Breteuil and Verneuil d'Avre et d'Iton
- Intercommunality: Normandie Sud Eure

Government
  - Mayor (2020–2026): Colette Bonnard
- Area^{1}: 125.03 km^{2} (48.27 sq mi)
- Population (2023): 6,078
  - Density: 48.61/km^{2} (125.9/sq mi)
- Time zone: UTC+01:00 (CET)
  - Summer (DST): UTC+02:00 (CEST)
- INSEE/Postal code: 27198 /27240, 27160
- ^{1} French Land Register data, which excludes lakes, ponds, glaciers > 1 km^{2} (0.386 sq mi or 247 acres) and river estuaries.

Mesnils-sur-Iton (French pronunciation: [mɛnil syʁ itɔ̃], literally Mesnils on Iton) is a commune in the department of Eure, northern France. The municipality was established on 1 January 2016 by merger of the former communes of Condé-sur-Iton, Damville (the seat), Gouville, Manthelon, Le Roncenay-Authenay and Le Sacq. On 1 January 2019, the former communes Buis-sur-Damville, Grandvilliers and Roman were merged into Mesnils-sur-Iton.

== Population ==
Population data refer to the commune in its geography as of January 2025.

Historical population
Year	Pop.	±% p.a.
1968	3,434	—
1975	3,486	+0.21%
1982	4,014	+2.04%
1990	4,736	+2.09%
1999	5,216	+1.08%
2007	5,856	+1.46%
2012	6,095	+0.80%
2017	6,122	+0.09%
2023	6,078	−0.12%
Source: INSEE

== See also ==
- Communes of the Eure department
