= Condé-sur-Iton =

- Part of Mesnils-sur-Iton
- Coat of arms
- Location of Condé-sur-Iton
- Location within France Location within Normandy
- Coordinates: 48°50′02″N 0°57′48″E
- Country: France
- Region: Normandy
- Department: Eure
- Arrondissement: Évreux
- Canton: Breteuil
- Commune: Mesnils-sur-Iton
- Area^{1}: 19.58 km^{2} (7.56 sq mi)
- Elevation: 168 m (551 ft)
- Highest elevation: 185 m (607 ft)
- Lowest elevation: 147 m (482 ft)
- Population (2023): 919
  - Density: 46.9/km^{2} (122/sq mi)
- Time zone: UTC+01:00 (CET)
  - Summer (DST): UTC+02:00 (CEST)
- Postal code: 27160
- ^{1} French Land Register data, which excludes lakes, ponds, glaciers > 1 km^{2} (0.386 sq mi or 247 acres) and river estuaries.

Condé-sur-Iton (French pronunciation: [kɔ̃de syʁ itɔ̃], literally Condé on Iton) is a former commune in the Eure department in northern France. On 1 January 2016, it was merged into the new commune of Mesnils-sur-Iton.

== See also ==
- Communes of the Eure department
