= Manthelon =

- Part of Mesnils-sur-Iton
- Location of Manthelon
- Location within France Location within Normandy
- Coordinates: 48°54′44″N 1°02′53″E
- Country: France
- Region: Normandy
- Department: Eure
- Arrondissement: Bernay
- Canton: Verneuil-sur-Avre
- Commune: Mesnils-sur-Iton
- Area^{1}: 14.55 km^{2} (5.62 sq mi)
- Elevation: 178 m (584 ft)
- Highest elevation: 177 m (581 ft)
- Lowest elevation: 115 m (377 ft)
- Population (2013): 347
  - Density: 23.8/km^{2} (61.8/sq mi)
- Time zone: UTC+01:00 (CET)
  - Summer (DST): UTC+02:00 (CEST)
- Postal code: 27240
- ^{1} French Land Register data, which excludes lakes, ponds, glaciers > 1 km^{2} (0.386 sq mi or 247 acres) and river estuaries.

Manthelon (French pronunciation: [mɑ̃tlɔ̃]) is a former commune in the Eure department in Normandy in northern France. On 1 January 2016, it was merged into the new commune of Mesnils-sur-Iton.

== See also ==
- Communes of the Eure department
