= Alfred Delauney =

French painter and engraver (1830–1894)

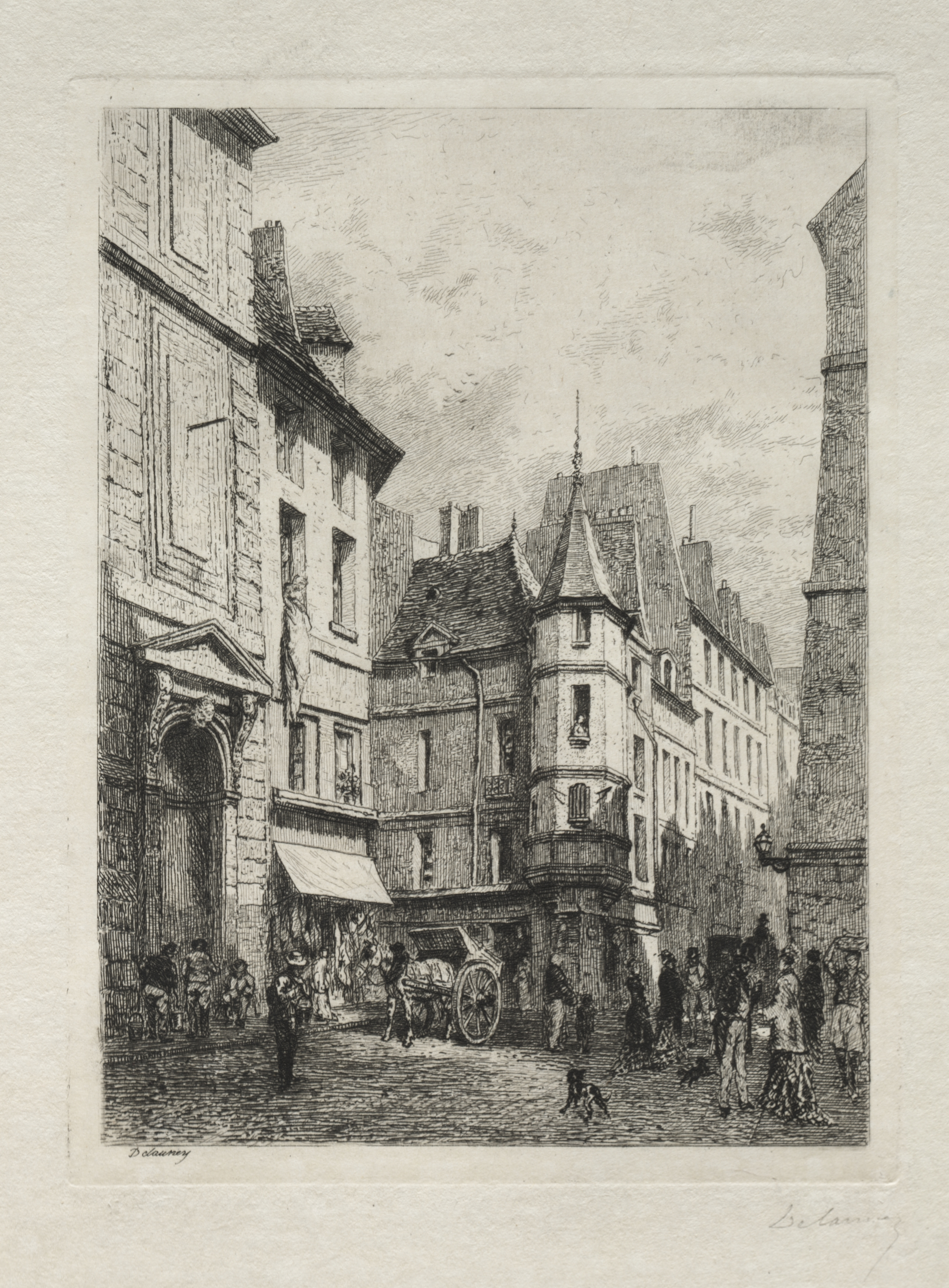
Turret in Fontaine Rue d'Ecole de Medicines demolished in 1877

Alfred-Alexandre Delauney (1830–1894) was a French painter and engraver.

== Life ==
Born on 13 July 1830 at Gouville in Normandy, Delauney came to Paris in 1842 at the age of twelve to work as an assistant to an elderly uncle named Salmon, his mother's brother, who was a print-seller. Salmon had a shop at 39, Rue de Seine, in the 6th arrondissement of Paris near the Louvre, called Librairie des Beaux-Arts, which in 1850 he transferred to his nephew. Had two children, Marthe, and Jean.

Delauney is considered a notable etcher as well as a painter. Jean-François Millet was one of the artists whose paintings were etched by Delauney, and one such etching, L'Hiver aux corbeaux (1862), has been noted as an inspiration to Vincent van Gogh. A collection of Delauney's etchings was published in Eaux-Fortes sur le vieux Paris, twenty-four plates dating between 1870 and 1878.

Alfred Delauney married Elise Charlotte-Eulallie Varin, the daughter of Pierre-Amédée Varin (1818–1883), another notable engraver. They had two children, Marthe Delauney, Jean Delauney. He died at Nanteuil-sur-Marne on 25 June 1894.
