= Jacques Villon =

French painter (1875–1963)

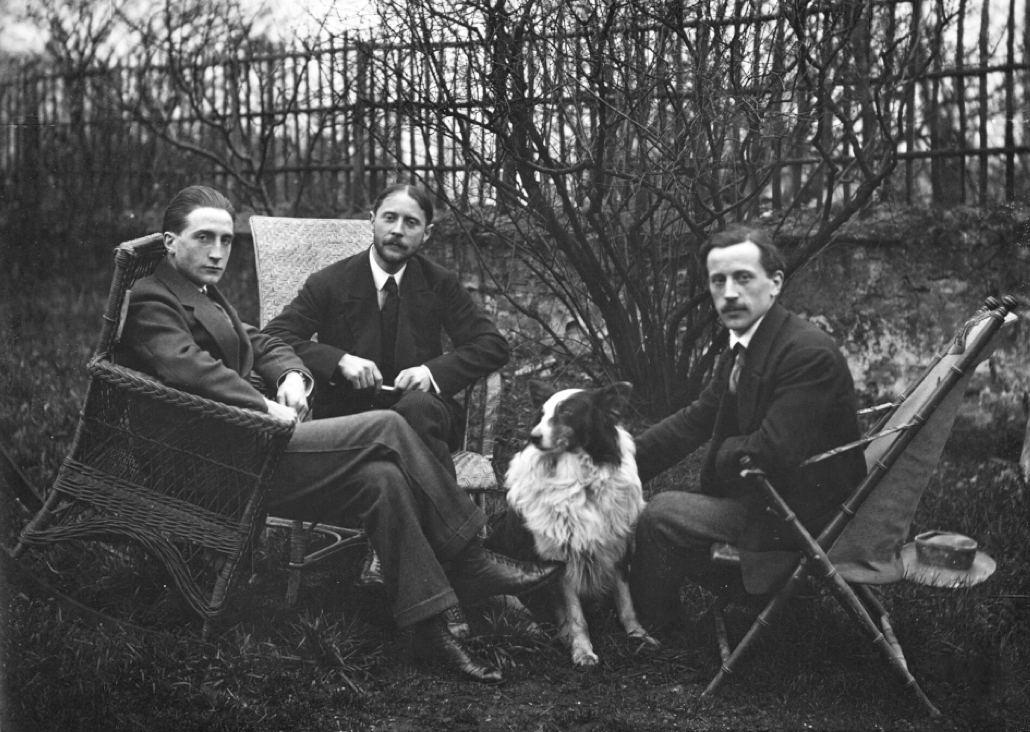
Three Duchamp brothers, left to right: Marcel Duchamp, Jacques Villon, and Raymond Duchamp-Villon in the garden of Jacques Villon's studio in Puteaux, France, 1914, (Smithsonian Institution collections.)

Le Petit Manège, rue Caulaincourt, 1905, University of Michigan Museum of Art

Jacques Villon (July 31, 1875 – June 9, 1963), also known as Gaston Duchamp, was a French Cubist and abstract painter and printmaker.

== Early life ==
Born Émile Méry Frédéric Gaston Duchamp in Damville, Eure, in Normandy, France, he came from a prosperous and artistically inclined family. While he was a young man, his maternal grandfather Émile Frédéric Nicolle, a successful businessman and artist, educated Villon and his siblings.

Gaston Duchamp was the elder brother of:

- Raymond Duchamp-Villon (1876–1918), sculptor
- Marcel Duchamp (1887–1968), painter, sculptor and author
- Suzanne Duchamp-Crotti (1889–1963), painter

In 1894, he and his brother Raymond moved to Montmartre in Paris. There, he studied law at the University of Paris, but received his father's permission to study art on the condition that he must continue studying law.

Jacques Villon, 1912, Girl at the Piano (Fillette au piano), oil on canvas, 129.2 x 96.4 cm (51 x 37.8 in), oval, Museum of Modern Art, New York. Exhibited at the 1913 Armory Show, New York, Chicago and Boston. Purchased from the Armory Show by John Quinn

To distinguish himself from his siblings, Gaston Duchamp adopted the pseudonym of Jacques Villon as a tribute to the French medieval poet François Villon. In Montmartre, home to an expanding art community, Villon lost interest in the pursuit of a legal career, and for the next 10 years he worked in graphic media, contributing cartoons and illustrations to Parisian newspapers. His work appeared in the satirical weekly Le Courrier français. Villon created only seven advertising posters in his career, all of which are in the soft styles of the Belle Epoque.

In 1903 he helped organize the drawing section of the first Salon d'Automne in Paris. In 1904-1905 he studied art at the Académie Julian.

At first, he was influenced by Edgar Degas and Henri de Toulouse-Lautrec, but later he participated in the fauvist, Cubist, and abstract impressionist movements.

By 1906, Montmartre was a bustling community and Jacques Villon moved to Puteaux on the quiet outskirts of Paris. There, he began to devote more of his time to working in drypoint, an intaglio technique that creates dark, velvety lines that stand out against the white of the paper. During this time he worked closely to develop his technique with other important printmakers such as Manuel Robbe.

His isolation from the vibrant art community in Montmartre, together with his modest nature, ensured that he and his artwork remained obscure for a number of years.

Jacques Villon, 1912, The Dining Table, oil on canvas, 65.7 × 81.3 cm, Metropolitan Museum of Art, New York

Jacques Villon, 1913, Portrait of Marcel Duchamp, oil on canvas, 60 x 48.5 cm

Jacques Villon, 1914, Portrait de M. J. B. peintre (Jacques Bon), oil on canvas, 121.92 x 81.28 cm, Columbus Museum of Art

At his home, in 1911, he and his brothers Raymond and Marcel organized a regular discussion group with artists and critics such as Jean Metzinger, Albert Gleizes, Francis Picabia, Robert Delaunay, Fernand Léger and others that was soon dubbed the Puteaux Group (or the Section d'Or). Villon was instrumental in having the group exhibit under the name Section d'Or after the golden section of classical mathematics. Their first show, Salon de la Section d'Or, held at the Galerie La Boétie in October 1912, involved more than 200 works by 31 artists.

In 1913, Villon created seven large drypoints in which forms break into shaded pyramidal planes. That year, he exhibited at the Armory Show in New York City, helping introduce European modern art to the United States. His works proved popular and all his art sold. From there, his reputation expanded so that by the 1930s he was better known in the United States than in Europe.

== Honors ==
Stained glass windows of Jacques Villon in the Saint-Stephen Cathedral in Metz.

An exhibition of Jacques Villon's work was held in Paris in 1944 at the Galerie Louis Carré, following which he received honors at a number of international exhibitions. In 1938 he was named Chevalier (Knight) of the Legion of Honor. In 1947 he was promoted to Officier (Officer) of the Legion of Honor. In 1950, Villon received the Carnegie Prize, the highest award for painting in the world, and in 1954 he was made a Commandeur (Commander) of the Legion of Honor. The following year he was commissioned to design stained-glass windows for the cathedral at Metz, France. In 1956 he was awarded the Grand Prix at the Venice Biennale exhibition.

Among Villon's greatest achievements as a printmaker was his creation of a purely graphic language for cubism – an accomplishment that no other printmaker, including his fellow cubists Pablo Picasso or Georges Braque, could claim.

Villon died in his studio at Puteaux.

In 1967, in Rouen, his last surviving artist brother Marcel helped organize an exhibition called Les Duchamp: Jacques Villon, Raymond Duchamp-Villon, Marcel Duchamp, Suzanne Duchamp. Some of this family exhibition was later shown at the Musée National d'Art Moderne in Paris.

Many important museums include works by Villon in their collections, including the Fine Arts Museums of San Francisco; Minneapolis Institute of Arts; Museum of Fine Arts, Boston; Art Institute of Chicago; Columbus Museum of Art (Columbus, Ohio); Museum of Modern Art, New York City; University of Michigan Museum of Art (Ann Arbor, Michigan); National Gallery of Art, Washington D.C.; Art Gallery of New South Wales (Sydney, Australia); Bibliothèque Nationale, Paris; and Musée Jenisch (Vevey, Switzerland).

Leading private collections which include the works of Villon are the Joachim Family Collection of Chicago, the (Rick) Vess & Family Collection of Detroit, and the Ginestet Family Collection of Paris.

== Art market ==
In May 2004, an oil painting by Villon dated 1913 entitled L'Acrobate and measuring 39 ¼ by 28 ¼ inches sold at Sotheby's for $1,296,000 (US dollars).

== Bibliography ==
- Tomkins, Calvin, Duchamp: A Biography. Henry Holt and Company, Inc., 1996. ISBN 0-8050-5789-7
