= Damville, Eure =

Part of Mesnils-sur-Iton in Normandy, France

Damville
- Part of Mesnils-sur-Iton
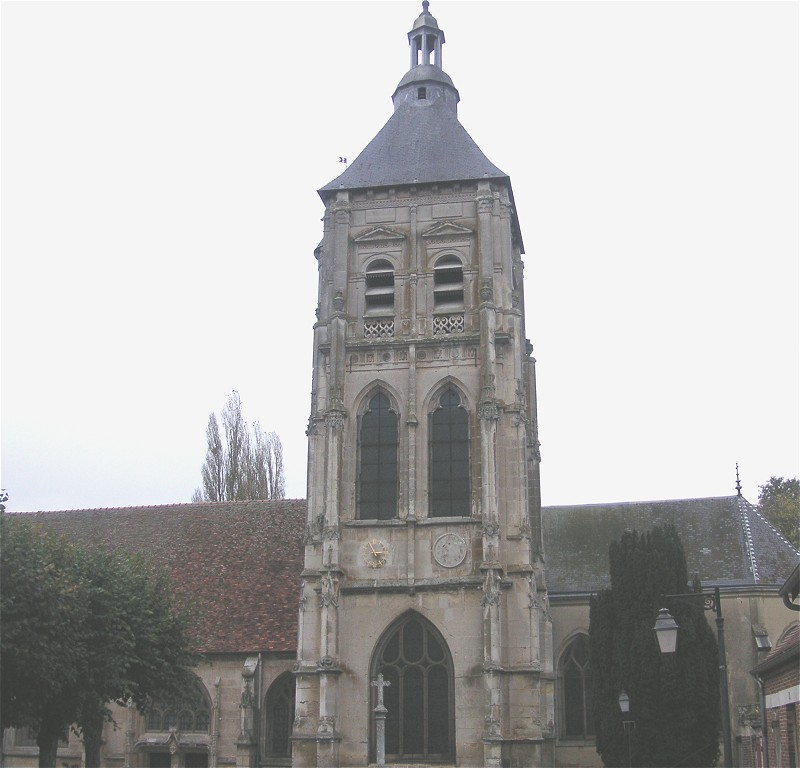

- Coat of arms
- Location of Damville
- Location within France Location within Normandy
- Coordinates: 48°52′14″N 1°04′32″E
- Country: France
- Region: Normandy
- Department: Eure
- Arrondissement: Bernay
- Canton: Verneuil-sur-Avre
- Commune: Mesnils-sur-Iton
- Area^{1}: 11.74 km^{2} (4.53 sq mi)
- Elevation: 145 m (476 ft)
- Highest elevation: 164 m (538 ft)
- Lowest elevation: 130 m (430 ft)
- Population (2013): 2,016
  - Density: 171.7/km^{2} (444.8/sq mi)
- Time zone: UTC+01:00 (CET)
  - Summer (DST): UTC+02:00 (CEST)
- Postal code: 27240
- ^{1} French Land Register data, which excludes lakes, ponds, glaciers > 1 km^{2} (0.386 sq mi or 247 acres) and river estuaries.

Damville (French pronunciation: [dɑ̃vil]) is a former commune in the Eure Department in the Normandy region in northern France. On 1 January 2016, it was merged into the new commune of Mesnils-sur-Iton.

== Population ==
Historical population
Year	Pop.	±% p.a.
1866	985	—
1962	1,141	+0.15%
1968	1,189	+0.69%
1975	1,345	+1.78%
1982	1,666	+3.10%
1990	1,897	+1.64%
1999	2,017	+0.68%
2006	2,031	+0.10%
2013	2,016	−0.11%
Source: EHESS and INSEE

== History ==
In the Middle Ages, Damville was important for its situation on the Norman border. The fortress of Damville was built in 1035. The castle was burned down by Henry II of England, in 1189, it was rebuilt by Richard the Lionheart.

== Personalities ==
- Raymond Duchamp-Villon (1876–1918), sculptor
- Jacques Villon (Gaston Duchamp) (1875–1963), painter, draughtsman and engraver.
- Michel Cluizel, chocolate factory founder
- André Couteaux, French novelist

== See also ==
- Communes of the Eure department
