= Grandvilliers, Eure =

Grandvilliers
- Part of Mesnils-sur-Iton
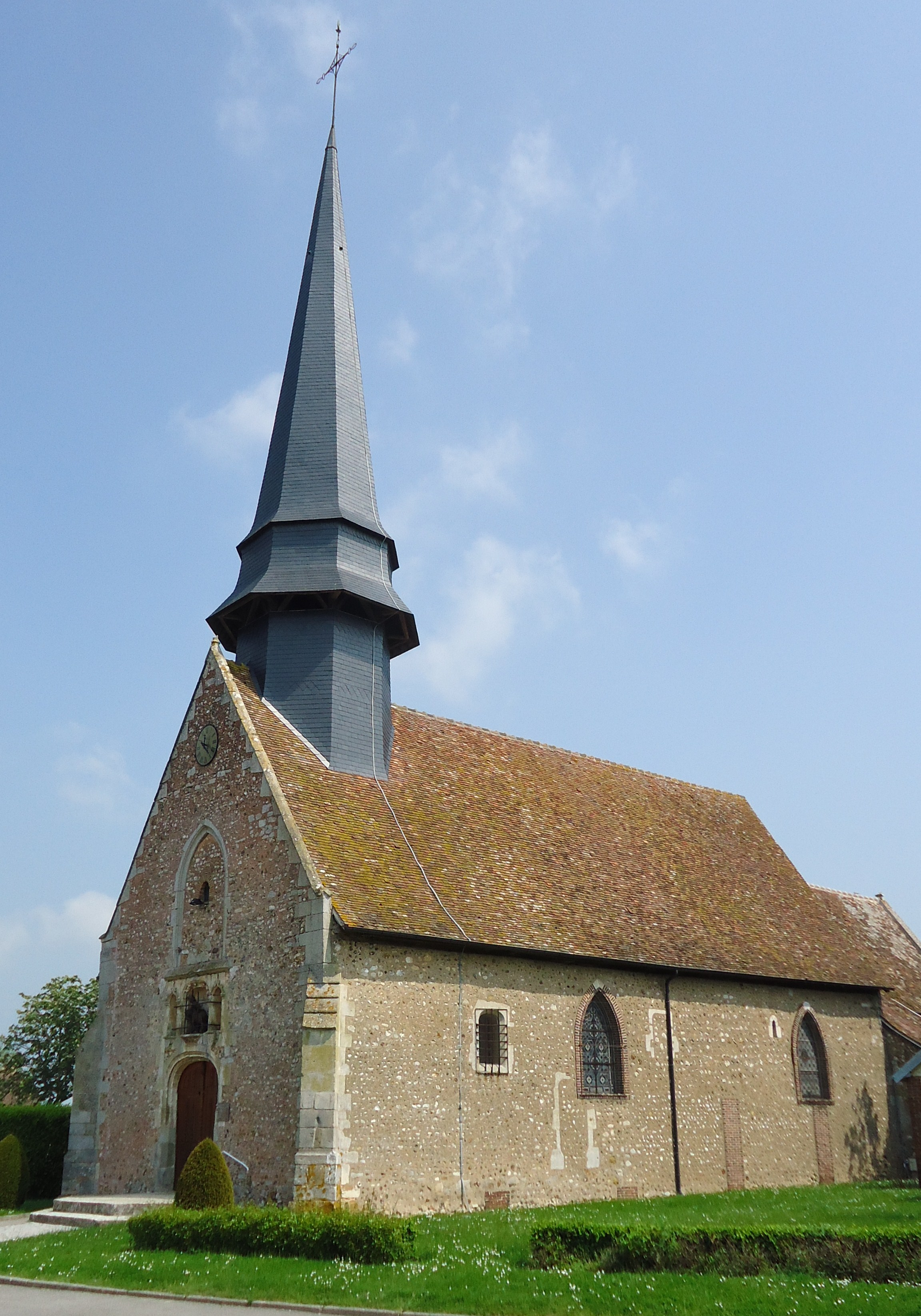
- The church of Saint-Martin, in Grandvilliers
- Location of Grandvilliers
- Location within France Location within Normandy
- Coordinates: 48°48′55″N 1°03′42″E
- Country: France
- Region: Normandy
- Department: Eure
- Arrondissement: Bernay
- Canton: Verneuil-sur-Avre
- Commune: Mesnils-sur-Iton
- Area^{1}: 17.66 km^{2} (6.82 sq mi)
- Elevation: 180 m (590 ft)
- Highest elevation: 179 m (587 ft)
- Lowest elevation: 150 m (490 ft)
- Population (2019): 322
  - Density: 18.2/km^{2} (47.2/sq mi)
- Time zone: UTC+01:00 (CET)
  - Summer (DST): UTC+02:00 (CEST)
- Postal code: 27240
- ^{1} French Land Register data, which excludes lakes, ponds, glaciers > 1 km^{2} (0.386 sq mi or 247 acres) and river estuaries.

Grandvilliers is a former commune in the Eure department in north-western France. On 1 January 2019, it was merged into the commune Mesnils-sur-Iton.

== See also ==
- Communes of the Eure department
