= Jean II de Montmorency =

Father of Guillaume de Montmorency, Grand Chamberlain of France

Jean II of Montmorency
- Baron de Montmorency
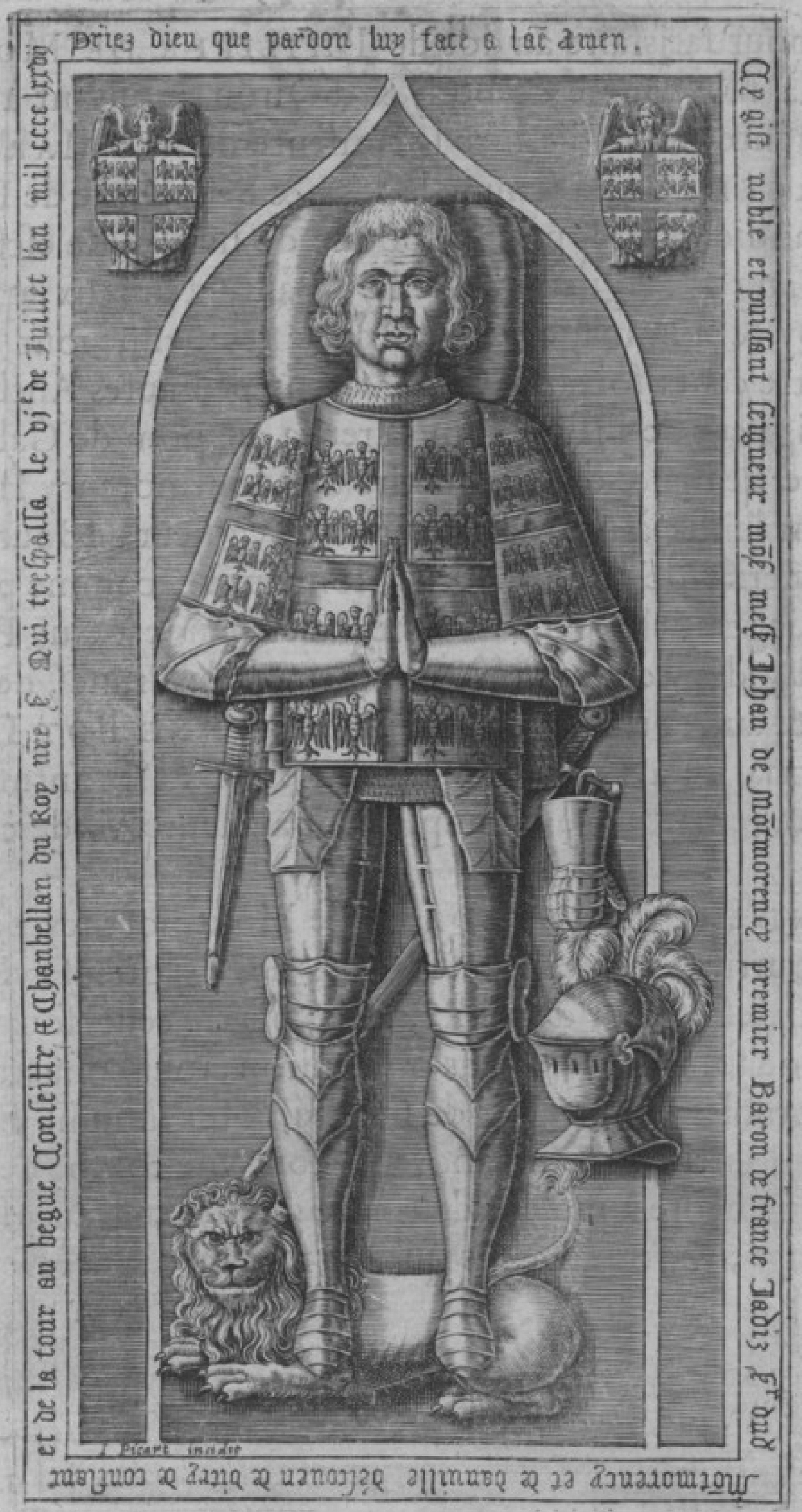
- Recumbent figure of Jean II
- Born: 1404
- Died: 6 July 1477 (aged 72–73)
- Noble family: Montmorency
- Spouses: (1) Jeanne de Fosseux (2) Marguerite d'Orgemont
- Issue Detail: Guillaume de Montmorency
- Father: Jacques de Montmorency
- Mother: Philippine de Melun

Jean II de Montmorency (c. 1404 – 6 July 1477, buried at Senlis), held the office of Grand Chamberlain of France. He was the eldest son of Jacques de Montmorency and Lady Philippine de Melun of Croisilles and Courrières, daughter of Hugues de Melun d'Epinoy.

== Biography ==
On the death of his father in 1414, the ten year old Jean inherited the barony of Montmorency and several Lordships, including those of Écouen, Damville and Conflans. He was initially placed under the regency of his mother, Philippine, who died around 1419. In 1422, he married Jeanne de Fosseux (died 12 September 1431), daughter of Jean de Fosseux and Anne de Preures. Jeanne had also inherited a number of lands, principally in Flanders.

Jeanne de Fosseux's father was a favourite of Duke of Burgundy, John the Fearless. When Jeanne died in September 1431 she was buried at the Cordeliers de Senlis, and she left to her husband Jean her wealthy lands which were enclosed within the territory held by the house of Burgundy.

In 1443 Jean married for a second time, his new wife being Marguerite d'Orgemont, widow of the knight Guillaume Broullard and great-granddaughter of the French chancellor Pierre d'Orgemont, Lord of Chantilly.

Jean de Montmorency fought alongside King Louis XI against the self-proclaimed League of the Public Good, led by the Duke of Burgundy, Charles the Bold. His two sons, Jean III (later Jean de Nivelle) and Louis de Montmorency-Fosseux (from his first wife Jeanne de Fosseux), refused to join him and sided with Charles the Bold. Jean de Montmorency then decided to disinherit his two elder sons in favour of Guillaume, his third son, and the first son from his marriage to Marguerite d'Orgemont. The elder sons were officially disinherited on 24 July 1463, the pronouncement held at the Château de la Chasse, situated in the centre of the forest of Montmorency.

As a result of this, his son Jean sought refuge at Nivelle, a territory that belonged to his mother Jeanne de Fosseux. Here he became the founder of the Montmorency-Nevele branch of the family. It was following this episode that the Jean III became known as Jean de Nivelle, a name that was used as a form of mockery by the French. He was mocked in popular songs of the time, and later gave rise to the expression "the more you call him, the more he runs away like Jean de Nivelle's dog".

Despite lawsuits and property transactions involving the branches of the Niville, de Fosseux and Montmorency families, the familial lands situated in France remained the property of the descendants of Jean II's son Guillaume de Montmorency.

== Ancestry ==
Through the Montmorency's, Jean II de Montmorency was descended from the French king Louis VI (via Louis's son Robert I, Count of Dreux).

32. Mathieu III de Montmorency
16. Mathieu IV de Montmorency
33. Jeanne de Brienne-Ramerupt
8. Jean Ier de Montmorency
34. Guy III de Lévis
17. Jeanne de Lévis
35. Isabelle de Marly-Montmorency
4. Charles Ier de Montmorency
36. Guillaume de Calletot
18. Robert de Calletot
37. Marie de Vernon
9. Jeanne de Calletot
38.
19. Jeanne de Houdenc
39.
2. Jacques de Montmorency
40.
20. Adam Ier de Villiers-le-Bel
41.
10. Adam dit le Bègue
42.
21.
43.
5. Pétronille de Villiers
44.
22.
45.
11. Alix de Méry
46.
23.
47.
1. Jean de Montmorency
48. Jean Ier de Melun
24. Adam IV de Melun
49. Jeanne de Tancarville
12. Jean Ier de Melun
50.Henri II de Sully
25. Jeanne de Sully
51. Péronelle de Joigny
6. Hugues de Melun
52. Hugues III d'Antoing
26. Hugues IV d'Antoing
53. Sybille de Wavrin
13. Isabelle d'Antoing
54. Gautier Ier d'Enghien
27. Marie de Sottegem
55. Marie de Rethel
3. Philippine de Melun
56.
28.
57.
14.
58.
29.
59.
7. Béatrix de Beaussart
60.
30.
61.
15.
62.
31.
63.

== Marriages and descendants ==
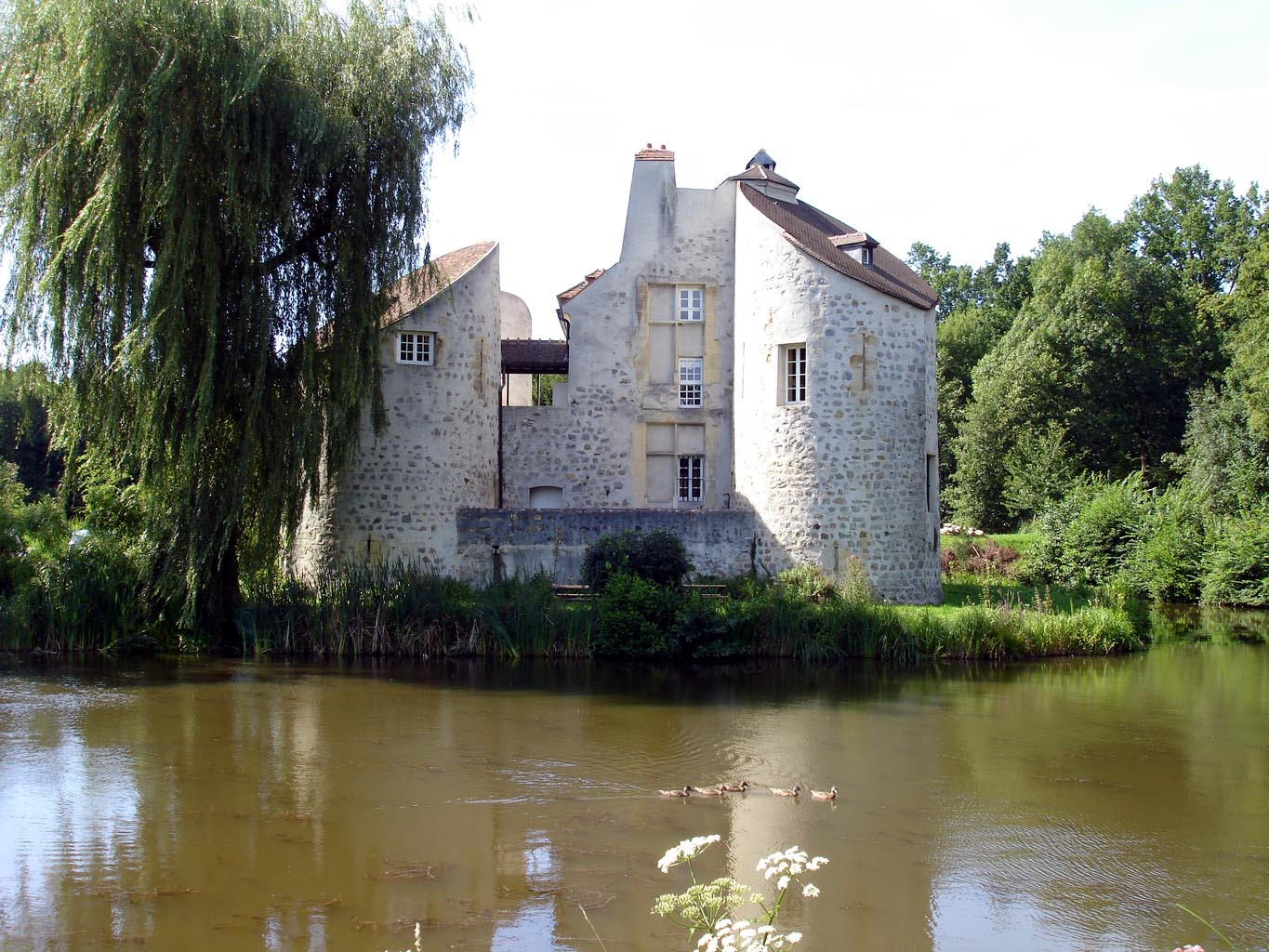
The château de la Chasse in the forest of Montmorency where the disinheritance of the sons of Jean II took place.

On 29 January 1422, Jean II married Jeanne de Fosseux, Lady of Fosseux, d'Hauteville, Nivelle et Wismes (died 12 September 1431), daughter of Jean de Fosseux and Anne de Preure. They had the following children:

- Jean de Montmorency-Nivelle and Wismes (1422 – 26 June 1477), known as Jean de Nivelle. Among his descendants was his great-grandson Philippe II de Montmorency, Count of Horn
- Louis de Montmorency-Fosseux and d'Hauteville (died 1 October 1490). From him are descended the Dukes of Montmorency-Beaufort, and Montmorency-Bouteville, the Dukes of Piney-Luxembourg, the Dukes of Châtillon-Coligny, the Marquis de Royan and the Counts of Dukes of d'Olonne, the Lords of Tingry and the Lords of Robecque.

Around 1445, Jean married Marguerite d'Orgemont, heiress to the lordships of Chantilly, Montépilloy and Montjay, the daughter of Pierre d'Orgemont and Jacqueline Paynel. They had the following children:

- Marguerite de Montmorency (1445 – 29 August 1498) who married Nicolas d'Anglure on 26 June 1471
- Guillaume de Montmorency (1454 – 24 May 1531), Chamberlain of France, and the father of the Constable of France, Anne de Montmorency.
- Philippe de Montmorency (died 20 or 21 November 1516), Lady of Vitry-en-Brie, was married on 23 March 1465 to the Grand Master of France, Charles de Melun (descended from the branches of the La Borde and Normanville families). On his death, Philippe married Guillaume Ier Gouffier, Lord of Boissy, on the 15 June 1472. Her descendants stem from this marriage.
