= Guillaume de Montmorency =

Father of Anne de Montmorency, Marshal of France

- Baron de Montmorency
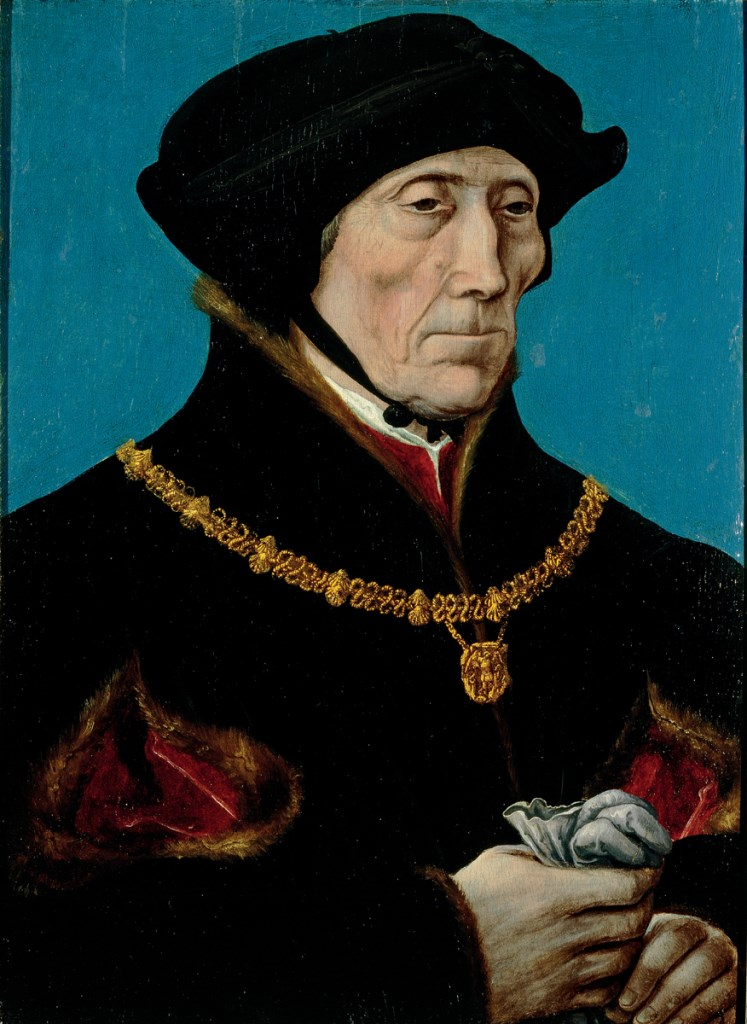
- Guillaume de Montmorency in 1520
- Born: 1453; Chantilly
- Died: 14 May 1531 (aged 77–78); Chantilly
- Noble family: Montmorency
- Spouse: Anne Pot (m. 1484; died 1510)
- Issue Detail: Anne de Montmorency
- Father: Jean II de Montmorency
- Mother: Marguerite d'Orgemont

Guillaume de Montmorency (1453 – 14 May 1531, Chantilly) was Baron de Montmorency and lord of Chantilly. As general of finances for the king, he was governor of several royal castles and accompanied Louis XII during the Italian War of 1494–1498.

== Biography ==
Guillaume, born in 1453, was the son of Jean II de Montmorency and his second wife Marguerite d'Orgemont. His father decided in 1472 to disinherit his eldest son Jean de Nivelle following the disputes between his first two sons and their pro-Burgundian tendencies. Guillaume therefore acquired the title of Baron de Montmorency in 1472 at the age of 18. This would lead to forty years of legal proceedings between the descendants. The title of baron was contested by his nephews Jean de Montmorency-Nevele then Philippe and finally by his youngest nephew Joseph de Montmorency. Through his father, Guillaume was lord of Écouen, Thoré, Montjay, Conflans-Sainte-Honorine. Through his mother, he was lord of Aufois, Chavard and Montepilloy. He entered the service of Charles IV of Anjou as chamberlain.

In 1484, Guillaume's maternal uncle Pierre III d'Orgemont, who died without children, bequeathed him the lordship of Chantilly and rebuilt the chapel of the castle there in 1507. In 1515, thanks to a papal bull, he obtained the right to have Mass and all the sacraments celebrated in this chapel. Guillaume took part in Estates General of 1484 in Tours as a deputy of the nobility of Paris during the minority of King Charles VIII and subsequently became chamberlain of the king of France. King Louis XII appointed him superintendent of waters and forests and gamekeeper in Touraine, as well as captain of castle of Saint-Germain-en-Laye. Guillaume join Louis XII during his Italian War of 1499–1504.

In 1503, Guillaume was appointed captain of the Bastille. He left for the Italian wars the same year with the king. On his return, Guillaume was rewarded for his loyalty by the post of governor of Orléans. During the War of the League of Cambrai, he was appointed to the Regency Council alongside Anne of Brittany in 1508. Guillaume was appointed captain of Château de Vincennes and made a knight of the Order of Saint Michael. During the Italian War of 1521–1526 he was responsible for the protection of Paris and for collecting funds from the Parlement of Paris to have King Francis I of France released, who was taken prisoner at the Battle of Pavia. Guillaume was a signatory of the Treaty of Madrid which freed the king.

Guillaume died at Château de Chantilly on 14 May 1531 and was buried in the Saint-Martin de Montmorency collegiate church which he had had erected. The black marble slab of his tomb is still visible there.

== Marriage and descendants ==
On 17 July 1484, Guillaume married Anne Pot (1472–1510), lady of La Rochepot, Damville and of Châteauneuf, countess of Saint-Pol, daughter of Guyot Pot and Marie de Villiers l'Isle- Adam. They had:

- Jean (c. 1485–1516) Lord of Ecouen, married Anne (Jeanne) de La Tour, lady of Montgascon (daughter of Godefroi de La Tour, baron of Montgascon)
- Anne de Montmorency (1493–1567), marshal of France (1522), grand master of France (1526), constable of France (1538), duke of Montmorency (1551), married Madeleine de Savoie in 1529 at Saint-Germain-en-Laye
- François de Montmorency (1496/98–1551), lord of La Rochepot and Châteauneuf, governor of Paris and Île-de-France, married (1524) Charlotte d'Humières, lady of Offemont and Encre, daughter of Jean, Lord of Humières, and of Françoise Le Josne de Contay
- Louise, (c. 1490–1547) lady of honor to Elisabeth of Austria, wife Ferry de Mailly, baron de Conti, then (1514) Gaspard I de Coligny lord of Coligny
- Philippe (c. 1496–1519), bishop of Limoges (1517)
- Anne (c. 1497–1525), married Guy XVI of Laval, count of Laval
- Marie (born c. 1500), Abbess of Notre-Dame de Maubuisson

== Sources ==
- Greengrass, M. (1988). "Propterty and Politics in Sixteenth-Century France: The Landed Fortune of Constable Anne de Montmorency". French History. 2 (4 December). Oxford University Press: 371–398.
- Groenveld, S. (2018). Facetten van de Tachtigjarige Oorlog: Twaalf artikelen over de periode 1559-1652 (in Dutch). Hilversum Velorum.
- Rentet, Thierry (2011). Anne de Montmorency, grand maître de François I (in French). Presses universitaires de Rennes.
- Rosenberg, Aubrey (1982). Nicolas Gueudeville and His Work (1652-172?). Martinus Nijhoff Publishers.
- Walsby, Malcolm (2007). The Counts of Laval: Culture, Patronage and Religion in Fifteenth- and Sixteenth-Century France. Ashgate.
- Ward, A.W.; Prothero, G.W.; Leathes, Stanley, eds. (1911). The Cambridge Modern History. Vol. XIII. Cambridge University Press.
