= Richard Gilmour =

American Catholic bishop (1824–1891)

The Right Reverend Richard Gilmour
- Bishop of Cleveland
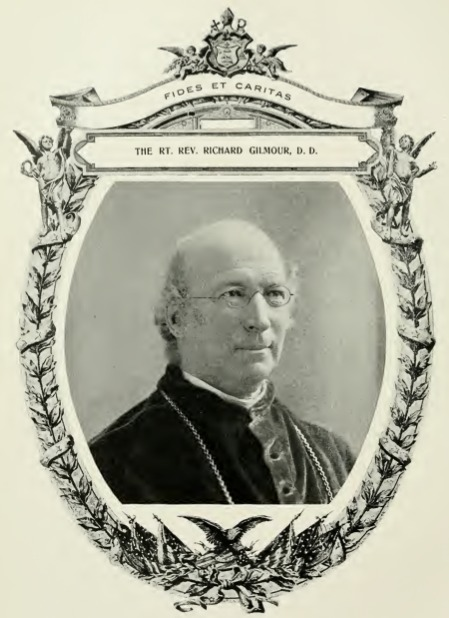
- Church: Catholic Church
- Diocese: Cleveland
- Appointed: February 15, 1872
- Term ended: April 13, 1891
- Predecessor: Louis Amadeus Rappe
- Successor: Ignatius Frederick Horstmann

Orders
- Ordination: August 30, 1852 by John Baptist Purcell
- Consecration: April 14, 1872 by John Baptist Purcell

Personal details
- Born: September 28, 1824 Glasgow, Scotland
- Died: April 13, 1891 (aged 66) St. Augustine, Florida, U.S.
- Motto: Fides et caritas (Latin for 'Faith and charity')

Richard Gilmour (September 28, 1824 – April 13, 1891) was an American Catholic prelate who served as the second Bishop of Cleveland from 1872 until his death in 1891.

== Early life and education ==
Richard Gilmour was born on September 28, 1824, in Glasgow, Scotland. He was the only child of John and Marion (née Callander) Gilmour, who were Covenanter Presbyterians. They immigrated to Pictou, Nova Scotia, in 1829, later settling on a farm near Cumbola, Pennsylvania.

In 1842, through the recommendation of a Catholic friend, Gilmour enrolled at a school run by Father Patrick Rafferty, pastor of St. Francis Xavier Church at Fairmount, then a suburb of Philadelphia. He was baptized by Father Rafferty on August 15 of that year. Both of his parents later converted to Catholicism as well.

In 1844, Bishop Michael O'Connor of the Diocese of Pittsburgh accepted Gilmour as a candidate for the priesthood and enrolled him at St. Michael's Seminary. However, after the seminary was closed in 1846, Gilmour was accepted into Mount St. Mary's College at Emmitsburg, Maryland. At Mount St. Mary's, he earned his tuition as a mathematics teacher and served as prefect of the college students. He graduated with a Master of Arts degree in 1848, and then entered the seminary at the same institution. Before his ordination, he was accepted to serve in the Archdiocese of Cincinnati.

== Priesthood ==
On August 30, 1852, Gilmour was ordained a priest by Archbishop John Baptist Purcell at the Cathedral of St. Peter in Chains in Cincinnati. He was then appointed pastor of the Church of the Nativity in Portsmouth, along with the surrounding missions. He separated the English- and German-speaking parishioners in Portsmouth, becoming pastor of Holy Redeemer Church for the former while St. Mary of the Annunciation Church was established for the latter. He also built St. Lawrence O'Toole Church in Ironton.

In 1857, Gilmour was appointed pastor of St. Patrick's Church in Cincinnati, succeeding Father James Frederick Wood (who had been appointed Bishop of Philadelphia). As pastor, he established a parochial school. Gilmour then briefly served as a professor at Mount St. Mary's Seminary of the West in Cincinnati (1868–1869). During this time, he published an English translation of a French book entitled Bible History. In 1869, he was appointed pastor of St. Joseph's Church in Dayton, where he remained until becoming a bishop.

== Bishop of Cleveland ==
Following the resignation of Bishop Louis Amadeus Rappe from the Diocese of Cleveland in 1870, the bishops of the ecclesiastical province of Cincinnati submitted a terna, or list of three candidates, to succeed him that included Gilmour, Father Silas Chatard, and Bishop Stephen V. Ryan. On February 15, 1872, Gilmour was appointed Bishop of Cleveland by Pope Pius IX. He received his episcopal consecration on the following April 14 from Archbishop Purcell, with Bishops Augustus Toebbe and Caspar Henry Borgess serving as co-consecrators.

At the beginning of Gilmour's tenure, the Diocese of Cleveland had 160 churches, 125 priests, and 90 parochial schools. By the end of his tenure, the diocese contained 229 churches, 208 priests, and 127 parochial schools. He established a diocesan newspaper, The Catholic Universe, whose first issue was published on July 4, 1874. In 1886, he and the Jesuits founded St. Ignatius College (now John Carroll University).

=== Catholic education ===
In 1873, in his first pastoral letter as bishop, Gilmour ordered every parish to establish a parochial school where possible and also authorized priests to deny the sacraments to Catholic parents who did not send their children to parochial schools without good reason. The pastoral letter sparked an anti-Catholic response from the local Cleveland Leader to the national Harper's Weekly, in which cartoonist Thomas Nast depicted Gilmour hurling thunderbolts against crouching Catholics.

In 1875, the Cuyahoga County auditor, Lanric D. Benedict, listed Cleveland's Catholic schools as delinquent in paying taxes and put them up at public auction. However, a year earlier, the Ohio Supreme Court had ruled that such property was not taxable. Gilmour subsequently filed an injunction in the Court of Common Pleas, which ruled in his favor in 1877. Upon appeal, the decision was upheld by the Ohio Supreme Court in 1883, ending the seven-year case and protecting parochial schools from taxation.

=== Third Plenary Council of Baltimore ===
Gilmour attended the Third Plenary Council of Baltimore from November to December 1884. Bishops Joseph Dwenger and John Moore were originally sent to Rome to obtain the pope's approval of the council's decrees, but faced difficulties. In May 1885, the American archbishops voted to send Gilmour to Rome to assist Dwenger and Moore. He arrived in Rome the following June, and secured Pope Leo XIII's approval of the decrees in September. When the Catholic University of America, which had been authorized by the council, opened in November 1889, Gilmour delivered a sermon at the ceremony.

=== Ladies' Land League and Edward McGlynn ===
Gilmour strongly opposed the Ladies' Land League and their "No Rent Manifesto," which he believed amounted to communism. He also believed the League was turning "our Catholic women into brawling politicians." When the Cleveland chapter of the League refused to disband, Gilmour excommunicated its members in 1882, saying, "Female modesty must be maintained let the cost be what it may."

When Father Edward McGlynn of New York later came to Cleveland to address the local chapter of the League, Gilmour wrote to the Holy See to denounce the priest. McGlynn was a strong supporter of economist Henry George, but Gilmour opposed the a possible condemnation of George's Progress and Poverty by the Holy See, which he believed would elevate George's profile.

=== Conflicts with clergy and religious ===
Gilmour was involved in a dispute with the Grey Nuns, who managed St. Vincent's Orphan Asylum in Toledo. His predecessor, Bishop Rappe, had transferred the orphanage's title to the Sisters in the belief that it would make the property more likely to remain nontaxable. When Gilmour attempted to gain the title back, the Sisters refused. In 1888, the Congregation for the Propagation of the Faith assigned Cardinal James Gibbons to resolve the dispute. In October of that year, Gibbons decided in the Sisters' favor.

Gilmour also became involved in a dispute with Father Patrick F. Quigley, pastor of St. Francis de Sales Church in Toledo. Quigley had angered the bishop after publicly criticizing Dennis Coghlin, known as the wealthiest man in Toledo, from his pulpit. In 1889, Gilmour suspended the priest and removed him from his position as pastor. Quigley subsequently appealed to the Holy See, which overruled Gilmour and reinstated the priest. The following year, Gilmour complained to his friend, Bishop Bernard John McQuaid of Rochester, that "Rome is steadily strangling the church in America" by its handling of disputes between priests and bishops.

== Death and legacy ==
Due to his declining health, Gilmour traveled to St. Augustine, Florida, in March 1891 to recuperate. He died there on April 13, 1891, at age 66.

After Gilmour's body was returned to Cleveland, Archbishop William Henry Elder celebrated a Requiem Mass on April 25, 1891, with Bishop McQuaid delivering the eulogy. He is buried in the crypt of the Cathedral of St. John the Evangelist.

Gilmour Academy in Gates Mills, Ohio is named in his honor.

== Sources ==
- Carr, Michael W. (1903). A History of Catholicity in Northern Ohio and the Diocese of Cleveland.
- Hynes, Michael J. (1953). History of the Diocese of Cleveland.

Catholic Church titles
| Preceded by Louis Amadeus Rappe | Bishop of Cleveland; 1872–1891 | Succeeded by Ignatius Frederick Horstmann |
