= Audrehem =

- Commune
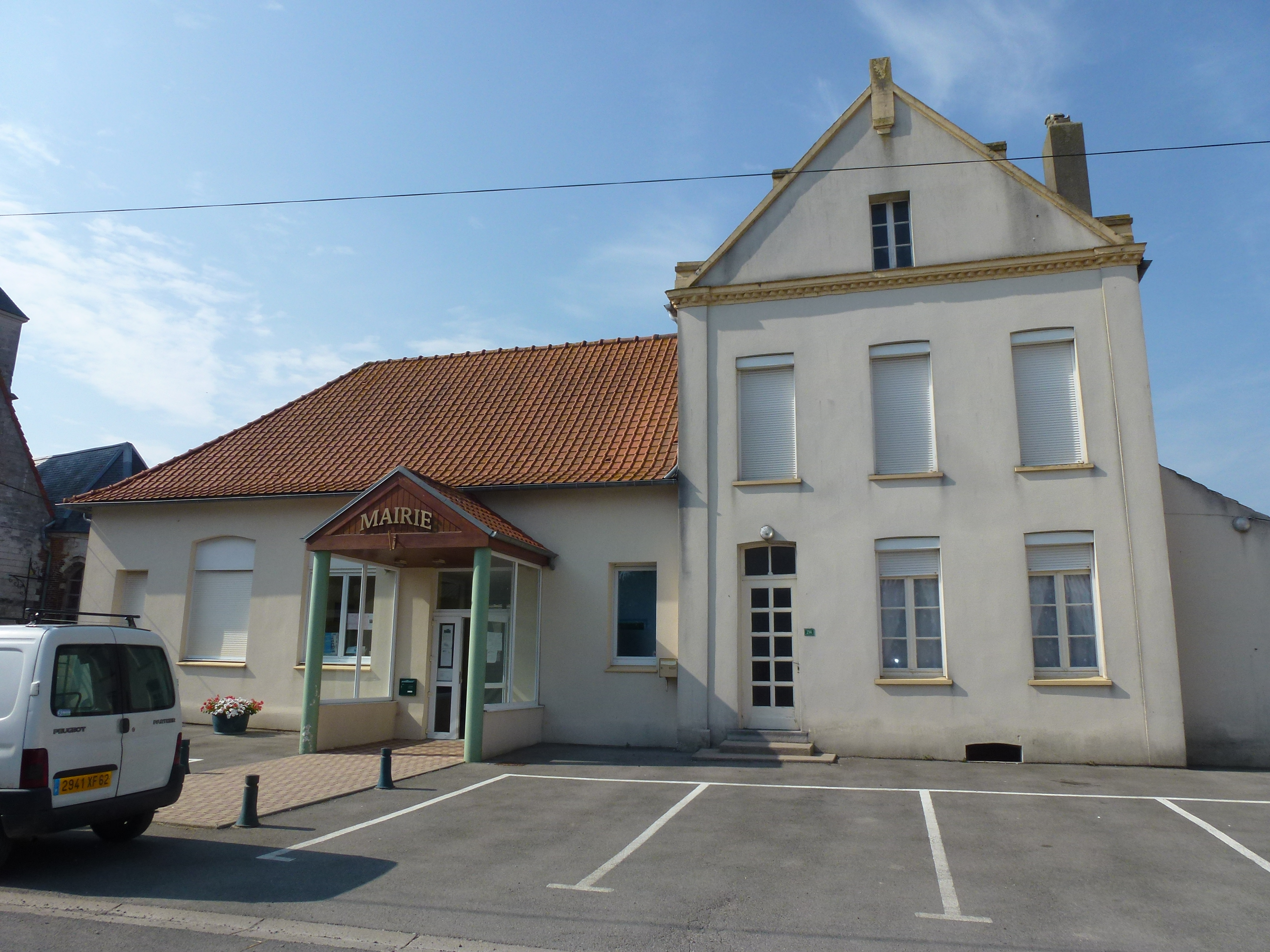
- The town hall of Audrehem

- Coat of arms
- Location of Audrehem
- Location within France Location within Hauts-de-France
- Coordinates: 50°46′55″N 1°59′28″E
- Country: France
- Region: Hauts-de-France
- Department: Pas-de-Calais
- Arrondissement: Saint-Omer
- Canton: Lumbres
- Intercommunality: Pays de Lumbres

Government
  - Mayor (2020–2026): Sébastien Lecaille
- Area^{1}: 9.19 km^{2} (3.55 sq mi)
- Elevation: 61 m (200 ft)
- Highest elevation: 171 m (561 ft)
- Lowest elevation: 42 m (138 ft)
- Population (2023): 521
  - Density: 56.7/km^{2} (147/sq mi)
- Time zone: UTC+01:00 (CET)
  - Summer (DST): UTC+02:00 (CEST)
- INSEE/Postal code: 62055 /62890
- ^{1} French Land Register data, which excludes lakes, ponds, glaciers > 1 km^{2} (0.386 sq mi or 247 acres) and river estuaries.

Audrehem is a commune in the Pas-de-Calais department in northern France.

== History ==
The commune's name is of Germanic origin and dates back to at least the 9th century. It was written in Old Low Franconian as Aldomhem between 844 and 864 and again in 877, and as Aldenehem in 1164. Consisting of inflexions of the element alt "old" and the extremely common toponymic suffix hem "home, village", the literal translation would be "old home" or "old village".

== Geography ==
The village is located 11 miles (18 km) northwest of Saint-Omer, at the junction of the D223 with the D217E road.

== Population ==
Historical population
Year	Pop.	±% p.a.
1968	319	—
1975	295	−1.11%
1982	283	−0.59%
1990	316	+1.39%
1999	357	+1.36%
2007	429	+2.32%
2012	502	+3.19%
2017	562	+2.28%
2023	521	−1.25%
Source: INSEE

== Sights ==
- The fifteenth century church of St. Médard.
- The remains of the 15th century manor de Fouquesolles.

== Personalities ==
Audrehem was the birthplace of Arnoul d'Audrehem (c. 1305-1370), Marshal of France.

Louis Amadeus Rappe (February 2, 1801 - August 9, 1877) first bishop of Cleveland OH, is born in Audrehem in a farmer family. The street where we can find his birth house is now named in his remembrance.

== See also ==
- Communes of the Pas-de-Calais department
