= Jacques of Montmorency =

Jacques of Montmorency (1370–1414) was lord of Montmorency, Écouen, Damville, Conflans-Sainte-Honorine, de Vitry-en-Brie, and de la Tour de Chaumont.

== Biography ==
He was the son of Charles of Montmorency and Pernelle de Villiers.

After the coronation of King Charles VI, Jacques and his brother Philip were knighted by the King. In 1382, at the age of 12, he accompanied the King on a campaign in Flanders, and took part in the battle of Rosebeek.

In 1391, the parliament of Paris confirmed the ancient privilege of the Montmorency family to be the first to buy fish delivered to Paris through their town of Saint-Bris at the usual price. At the same time, it was for the first time established that the lords of Montmorency were the most ancient barons of France.

Despite his youth, King Charles VI appointed Jacques of Montmorency as chamberlain and Duke Philip II of Burgundy granted him the same position at his court.

== Family ==
He was married (1399) to Philippine de Melun, dame de Croisilles (d.1420)

- Jean II of Montmorency (d.1477) His first wife was Jeanne de Fosse, lady of Nivelles (d.1431). His second marriage was to Marguerite de Orgemont (d.1484/1488)
- Phillippe of Montmorency, lord of Croisilles (d.1473/1474) His first marriage was to Marguerite de Bourgh. His second marriage was to Gertrude de Reymersweile. His third marriage was to Antoinette de Onchy, lady of Saint-Leu (d. after 1474)
- Pierre of Montmorency (d. before 1422)
- Denis of Montmorency (d. 1473) Dean of the chapter of Tournai, Bishop of Arras

Illegitimate children:

- Jacques (d.after 1459)
- Denise
- Joan (d. after 1454)
