= François de Montmorency, sieur de La Rochepot =

French military commander, governor and diplomat (1496/8–1551)

François de Montmorency
- sieur de La Prune au Pot sieur de La Rochepot
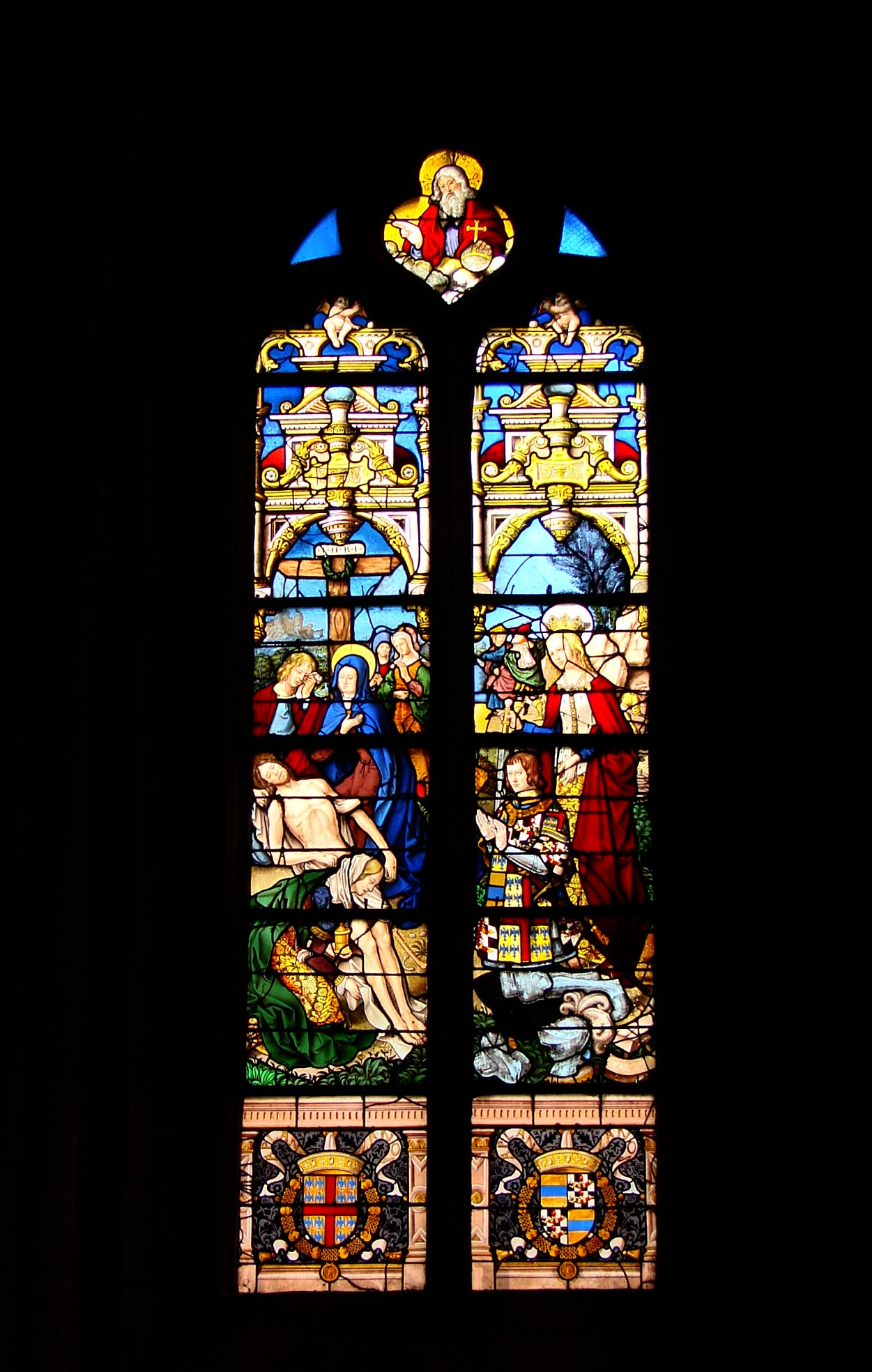
- Stained glass relief showing the sieur de La Rochepot kneeling on the right, the arms of Montmorency are quartered with those of Pot on his tunic
- Born: c. 1496; Paris
- Died: 20 August 1551; Péronne
- Noble family: Montmorency
- Spouse: Charlotte d'Humières
- Father: Guillaume de Montmorency
- Mother: Anne Pot

François de Montmorency, sieur de La Rochepot (1496/8, Paris–20 August 1551 Péronne) was a French noble, military commander, courtier, and governor during the latter Italian Wars of François I. A younger son of Guillaume de Montmorency and Anne Pot, La Rochepot's career was elevated by the meteoric rise in royal favour that was enjoyed by his elder brother Anne de Montmorency. Starting out in 1515 La Rochepot served as the captain of Beauvais in Picardie. He served as a hostage to England for the treaty that saw the return of Tournai to France in 1518. His first sign of royal favour came in 1520 when he was made a gentilhomme de la chambre du roi (gentleman of the king's chamber) granting him a degree of privileged access to the king. La Rochepot accompanied the vanguard for the French invasion of Italia in late 1524, and was present at the disastrous Battle of Pavia at which the royal army was destroyed, and the king made captive. La Rochepot was likewise made captive, but was able to raise his ransom quickly and returned to France to inform the Paris Parlement of the king's condition. The Parlement granted him authority in the Île de France.

The Parlement was dissatisfied with the state of affairs by which Picardie, a border province, lacked a governor who was present in the province at this time of crisis. Therefore, first the comte de Brienne (count of Brienne) and then La Rochepot were appointed as deputy governor of the province in 1531. Around this time he also became bailli du Palais (bailiff of the royal palaces) and received the honour of the Ordre de Saint-Michel (Order of Saint-Michel). In Picardie he shared responsibilities for administration with the duc de Vendôme (duke of Vendôme) until Vendôme's death in 1537. At this time, with Vendôme's son too young to immediately succeed to the office, La Rochepot was temporarily granted the responsibility of governing Picardie as a full governor. He held this office through the royal campaign in the area, before the new duc de Vendôme succeeded to the role in 1538. Relieved of his authority, La Rochepot was compensated with the governate of the Île de France while he returned to the position of deputy governor in Picardie. In 1541 he and his brother were disgraced by the king, and removed from their governates. Until the end of François' reign he would hold only his captaincy of Beauvais. With the ascent of Henri II he returned to favour, and was restored to his governate and deputy governate responsibilities. He had a central role to play in the efforts to recover Boulogne from the English occupation, both in the raising of troops for the military recovery of the town, and when this did not work out, the diplomatic efforts that eventually brought about its ceding). La Rochepot died on 20 August 1551, and was succeeded as governor of the Île de France by his nephew Admiral Coligny

== Early life and family ==
=== Birth ===
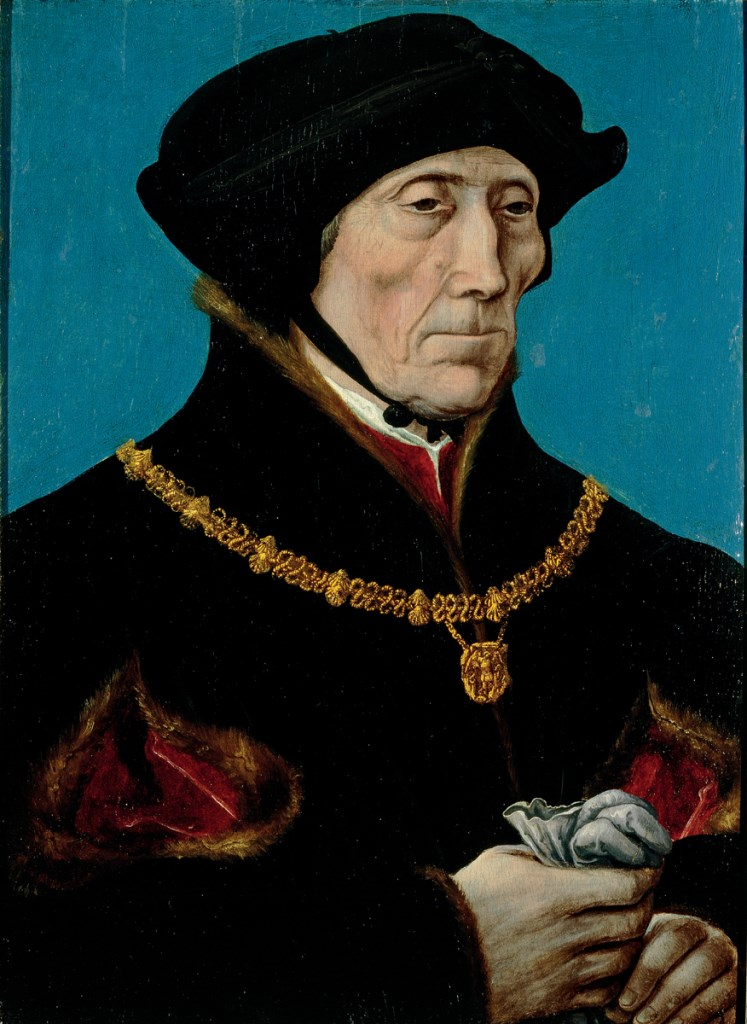
Guillaume de Montmorency, father of La Rochepot

François de Montmorency was born around 1496–1498 in Paris the third son of Guillaume de Montmorency, the premier baron of the Île de France and Anne Pot. The Pot family was originally from Bourgogne, and had served both the king's of France and Valois ducs de Bourgogne (dukes of Bourgogne). His elder brothers were Jean de Montmorency, sieur d'Écouen (who died young in 1516) and Anne de Montmorency. He had a younger brother, Phillipe de Montmorency, bishop of Limoges, who also died young in 1519. Before the death of his eldest brother, La Rochepot may have been destined for a life in the church.

=== Charlotte d'Humières ===
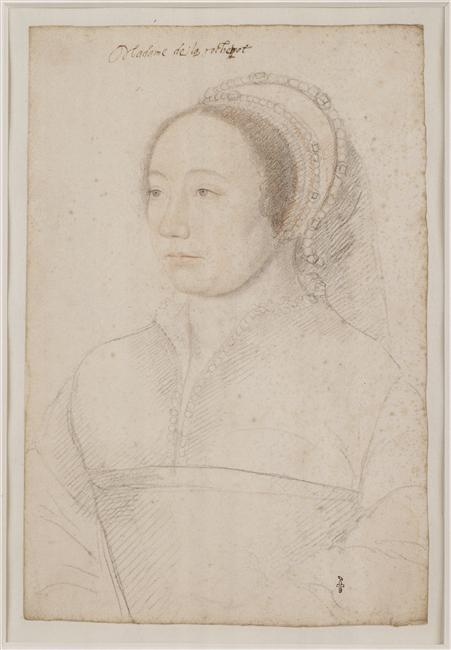
Sketch of Charlotte d'Humières, wife of La Rochepot

La Rochepot was betrothed to Charlotte d'Humiėres in 1522, and in April 1525 the marriage contract was drawn up. Charlotte was a daughter of Jean II d'Humières and Françoise de Contay. The Humières family had a prominent place among the Picard nobility and had been allies of the Montmorency since the turn of the century. Thus the match complemented the power of the Montmorency in the province. As a result, her father found himself more closely tied to Montmorency, with whom his relationship had prior solely been one of friendship.

La Rochepot and Charlotte would not have any children, though La Rochepot may had have a daughter out of wedlock, if a later claimant is to be believed.

For La Rochepot, his new bride brought the Picard lands of Offrémont, Mello, Ancre and Bray upon the death of Louise de Nesle who had possessed them. From 1525 Louise allowed the couple to settle her inheritance in their joint favour. By this means upon Nesle's death in 1530, La Rochepot became a great Picard lord. He had already purchased some of Louise's lands from her in 1526 so he could begin exercising control of them more promptly. If La Rochepot died without producing an heir, the Picard lands Louise provided would revert to the Humières, while the Montmorency would retain possession of the Beauvaisis lands. La Rochepot also agreed to settle Louise's debts and took care of her in her old age.

Charlotte would jointly administer the couples lands with her husband, issuing payment orders in her own name.

=== Religious temperament ===
Religiously, La Rochepot was drawn towards mystical exaltation. He had a particular attachment to a fragment of the true cross that was kept at Offrémont. He ensured it was used in exorcism to release his brother in law Charles d'Humières from an 'evil spirit'. La Rochepot was a great advocate for the Celestine house that held the relic.

La Rochepot enjoyed residences in Paris, Abbeville and Amiens, with another residence potentially in Beauvais. He further possessed his châteaux at Mello and Offrémont. The territory surrounding which he worked assiduously to aggrandise and consolidate.

=== Inheritance and title ===
The early deaths of his brothers complicated the matters of the family inheritance, and therefore La Rochepot's title. From 1510 to 1522, La Rochepot's elder brother, Anne held the title of La Rochepot. La Rochepot was therefore known as La Prune au Pot. For a brief window towards the end of this period, La Rochepot was known as the sieur de Thoré. In September 1522 he and his brother undertook an agreement at Poissy in the presence of Chancellor Duprat, Admiral Bonnivet and others. With no surviving brothers, and the death of their brothers only daughter, Anne and François worked out a partage for the death of their father. La Rochepot received a quarter of the ancestral Montmorency and Écouen domains and the seigneuries of Anne Pot: La Rochepot, Châteauneuf, Saint-Romain, Mersault, Thoré and La Prune au Pot. As a recognition of this agreement, La Rochepot quartered his arms with those of Pot.

Though a lord in Bourgogne, La Rochepot would be entirely absentee, with not even one of his acts dated from Bourgogne.

== Reign of François I ==
=== Beauvais ===
From 1515, La Prune au Pot (as he was then known) held the captaincy of Beauvais in Picardie. Prior to his exercise of the office it had been held by his father Guillaume de Montmorency. As captain of Beauvais, La Prune au Pot on occasion received lavish gifts from the town, as in November 1534. He was expected in return to champion the towns issues at court. This could involve requests to remove garrisons, aid in disputes against local ecclesiastical authorities (including the bishop of Beauvais, his cousin Charles de Villiers) or protect the town from marauding troops. In his absence, La Prune au Pot appointed deputies from the Boileau family to exercise authority.

In the 1518 treaty established with Henry VIII for the return of Tournai to France, there was an exchange of hostages as guarantee of the terms agreed. La Prune au Pot was among those sent as a hostage to England. Though he was originally intended to remain in the kingdom until 1521 when four hostages on each side would be exchanged back he was likely returned early in 1519.

Upon his return he took charge of a compagnie d'ordonnance (ordinance company) and mustered it for the first time. This gave him responsibility over a group of gentlemen hommes d'armes (men-at-arms), the number of which varied from 30 in the wake of the Pavia campaign, to 100 in 1549.

With his elder brothers establishment as premier gentilhomme de la chambre du roi (first gentleman of the king's chamber) in 1520, La Prune au Pot followed in the wake of this royal favour, becoming a gentilhomme de la chambre du roi (gentlemen of the king's chamber) at this time. This brought the two men proximity to the king to differing degrees. It also brought La Prune au Pot an income of 1200 livres.

At the time of the English invasion of October 1523, La Rochepot (as he was now titled after the partage with his brother) was in the north, and sent out orders to ensure that all supplies were brought within the walls of Beauvais so they could not be seized.

=== Pavia ===
French campaign into Italia 1524–1525, La Rochepot's brother Montmorency swings up towards Alessandria, La Rochepot and the vanguard are represented by 'La Palice' on the diagram

La Rochepot had travelled south to the Italian front by 1524. Holding a position in Italia he was warned by Admiral Bonnivet that his position was threatened. La Rochepot consulted with his captains and concluded their position was acceptable and just required some reinforcements.

His time in Italia was short, and he was back on the Picard front in July 1525. Here he rendezvoused with the duc de Vendôme for the aim of an attack against Thérouanne.

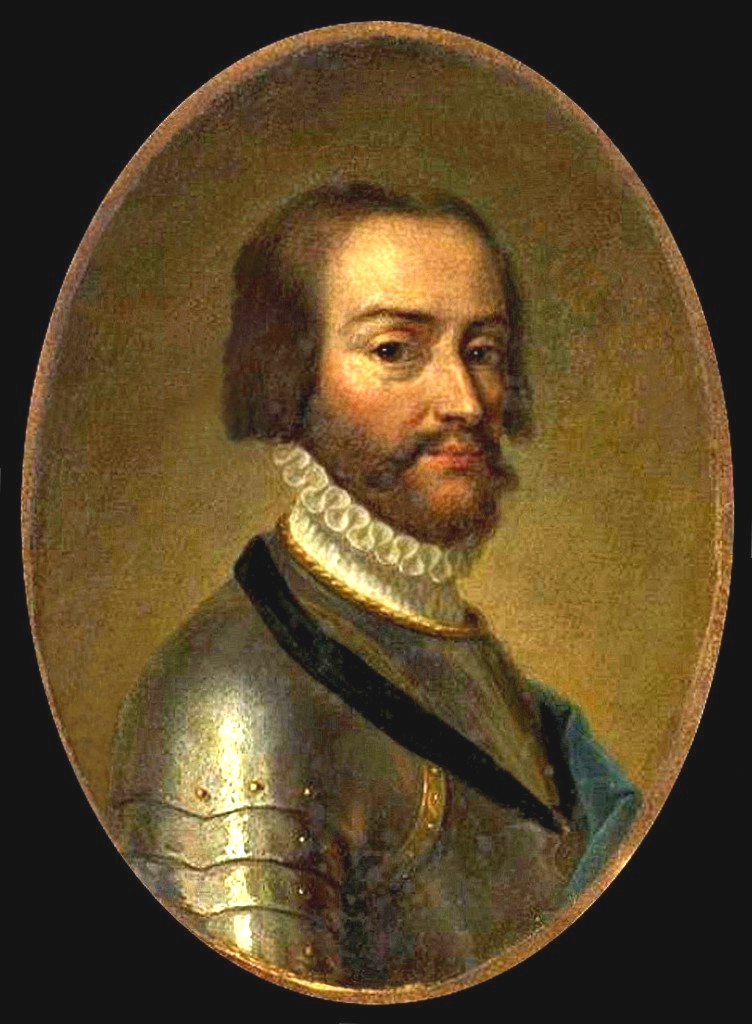
Duc de Vendôme, governor of Picardie and the Île de France

For the royal campaign of 1525, La Rochepot was in the armies vanguard of 500 lances under the authority of Marshal Chabannes. He was therefore present at the disastrous battle of Pavia where he was captured, as the king and his elder brother were. La Rochepot would not long be in captivity, and upon his bail he was granted permission (as no other captain of men-at-arms was) to meet with the captive king first before he departed back to France. La Rochepot recorded his observations of the sad state of his king. François provided him with a letter to give the Parlement such that they would expend all their energies in support of the regency government. By the time he was back in Paris in March 1525 he joined forces with his father and recounted the events that had transpired before the entire court, at this time his entire ransom had been collected.

La Rochepot made a good impression on the Parlement and was named for the government of the Île de France alongside his father. La Rochepot was primarily concerned in this period with his governate of Beauvais, and he sought to ensure its defences were in good condition. The artillery was inspected and an agreement made to undertake refounding.

In the coming years, La Rochepot served as an intermediary between the French and English courts. This included meeting with Cardinal Wolsey in July 1527 to discuss a planned meeting of the Cardinal and François. When François was obstructed by an accident from this meeting, La Rochepot informed Wolsey of the delay to the plans.

From 1528 La Rochepot got involved in a long running dispute with the municipal authorities of Beauvais over a cognisance of a criminal case involving the theft of firearms from the hôtel de ville (town hall). La Rochepot claimed it fell under his jurisdiction but was resisted by both the city grandees and ecclesiastical grandees of Beauvais. He used his influence at court to evoke the case to the conseil privé (privy council) but matters would drag on to 1532, neither side willing to back down.

=== Deputy governor ===
The crisis brought about by Pavia created a situation in which the absence of Picardie's governor (the duc de Vendôme) at court was unacceptable to the Parlement of Paris. The Parlement demanded that Picardie be governed by a substitute in Vendôme's absence, a 'deputy governor'. At first the comte de Brienne filled the charge, but he died in late 1530. On 1 May 1531 the king therefore appointed La Rochepot to assume the role of governor in Picardie during the absence of Vendôme.

The following year, in August, La Rochepot succeeded François Robertet to the office of bailli du Palais (bailiff of the royal palaces). For this office he would receive an income of 600 livres (pounds).

Collar of the Ordre de Saint-Michel

Going forward La Rochepot received a royal pension, which would peak at a value of 6000 livres after he became the governor of Picardie. Some time before May 1534 (Potter suspects after his appointment in Picardie) La Rochepot received the honour of becoming a chevalier (knight) of the Ordre de Saint-Michel (Order of Saint-Michel).

Though there would be some tension in the coming years between Vendôme and La Rochepot over the administration of the province, they were not abnormally severe. La Rochepot's garrison orders on occasion resulted in protests from the towns to Vendôme but there was not serious discord. During periods of warfare in the north, the volume of administration La Rochepot dealt with increased dramatically, and from May to July 1536, he received 68 despatches which survive. The rigours of war caused some losses to La Rochepot's territories in Picardie (in particular the sack of Ancre), therefore in compensation Montmorency secured for him the baillage of Caen in Normandie. In response to the sack of Ancre, it was proposed a garrison be installed in the settlement, La Rochepot vigorously protested arguing Ancre had suffered enough.

Both Vendôme and La Rochepot were 'compelled' to extort the towns of Picardie for the necessary supplies to support the Picard armies during the 1530s, due to the great strain that existed on the supply that would have come from the Île de France.

Unlike the role of governor, that of the deputy was a fairly informal position. This meant that when La Rochepot suffered an injury from a fall in November 1536, the king allowed him a leave of absence from his responsibilities. His injury was of great concern to his brother, and Montmorency attempted to secure the best medical professions for La Rochepot. During his absence, his father in law, Jean II d'Humières temporarily became deputy governor, holding the charge until February 1537.

=== Governor ===
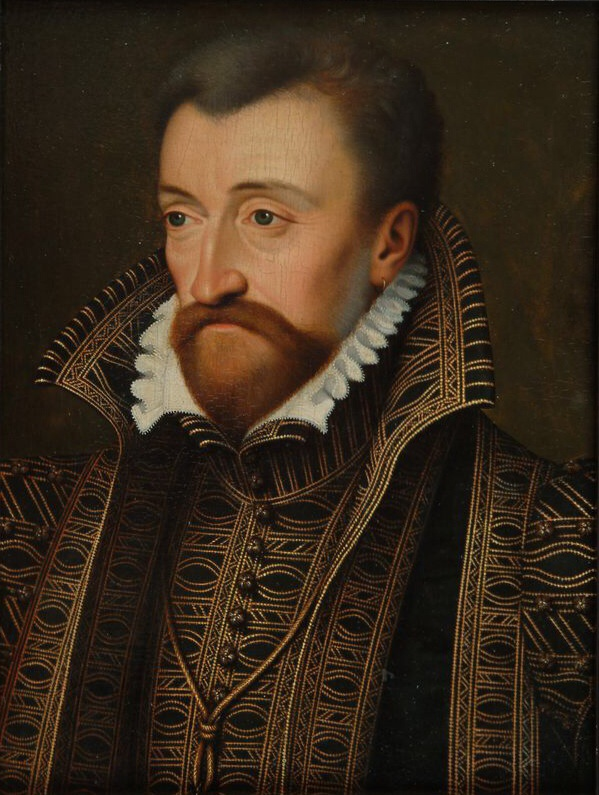
Antoine de Bourbon, duc de Vendôme was too young to immediately succeed his father as governor, therefore allowing La Rochepot to become full governor on a temporary basis

On 26 March 1537, Vendôme died. The office of governor of Picardie thus fell vacant, while his son the comte de Marle was only young, his claims to inherit the office were not insubstantial. the queen of Navarre pushed for La Rochepot's candidacy on a temporary basis. It was on this understanding, that his position was a stopgap to handle the present military situation that La Rochepot was therefore issued letters of provision to make him governor on 13 May of that year. There had been much opposition to his appointment according to Jean du Bellay. During this year he resigned the office of bailli (bailiff) and concierge of the royal palaces in favour of the Montmorency client Nicolas Berthereau.

The royal army was present in the north on campaign during 1537, which reduced the need to provide La Rochepot with a deputy. However, the dauphin was also on campaign, and the king therefore established him as lieutenant-general of Picardie, Normandie and the Île de France on 18 October. Going forward, La Rochepot's position in Picardie was formally subordinate to that of the king's son. Orléans (as the dauphin was titled) was however fairly uninterested in the responsibilities of the role, and petitioned the king to be relieved of the charge in December.

As governor of Picardie, La Rochepot was expected to handle many of the expenses required of the office himself, putting forward resources in his possession and then later petition the crown for reimbursement. Both La Rochepot and Vendôme frequently struggled to receive compensation from the crown for their expenditures. Indeed, in one incident in 1537, the intervention of his brother was necessary so he could 'redeem his plate'.

=== Île de France ===
He left his charge as governor of Picardie sometime in the first two months of 1538, the new duc de Vendôme (formally the comte de Marle) ascending to the charge. Despite now being governor, Vendôme remained keen to defer to La Rochepot in matters of decision making. This removal was compensated with his establishment as governor of the Île de France on 10 February of that year. The Île de France was traditionally an area in which the Montmorency exerted influence.

The Île de France, in contrast with the great provincial governates, enjoyed alternate channels by which it could exert its influence on the state. Nevertheless, a delegation went to meet him shortly after his appointment, in the hopes that he could secure an annulment of a four-month levy for 3000 soldiers that had been placed on Paris. La Rochepot advocated for his new governate to his brother, but was able to achieve little by his appeals for relief. Several attempts would fail to win over the chancellor, and in February 1539 the city reluctantly agreed to support the company.

Over his career, 93% of his surviving correspondence would be sent from either Picardie, or the Île de France, giving La Rochepot quite a focused area in which he was politically active.

La Rochepot was not however deprived of his responsibilities entirely in Picardie, and returned to the position he had occupied prior to 1537, as the deputy governor to Vendôme. Vendôme at first governed the province in letters conducted back and forth to court, and he issued his first ordonnance (ordinance) as governor in November 1538. The two would work closely, as Vendôme's father had with La Rochepot, and it would not be until May 1541, that Vendôme made his formal entrance into the province. During 1538 La Rochepot effectively enjoyed practical control of both Picardie and the Île de France, which was militarily convenient as the latter province was critical for the supply of armies in the former.

In December 1538 La Rochepot made his ceremonial entrance into Paris, flanked by 36 nobleman, mainly of esteemed Picard families such as the Créqui and Estourmel.

During the 1530s, La Rochepot developed a great investment in ships for the purpose of privateering. He possessed at least two flotillas of galleons. These came to the fore during the war with England, raiding the coast of Vlaanderen. The moves towards peace with the Empire in 1537 complicated their activities, with dispute over whether their prizes were legal. The value of privateering to La Rochepot could be significant, and a prize attained by his captains in early 1538 was worth around 60,000-80,000 écus (crowns).

=== Ascendency of Montmorency ===
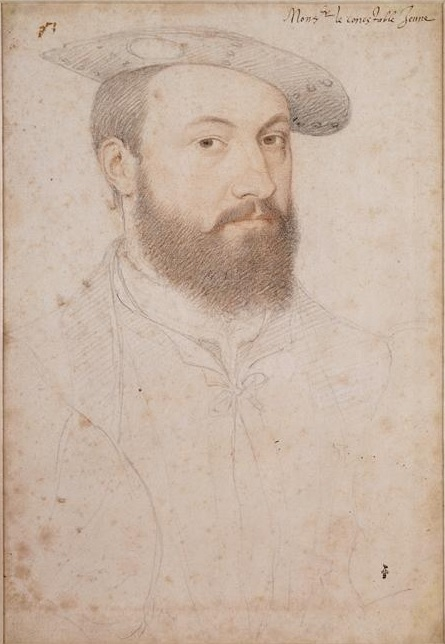
La Rochepot's brother Montmorency in 1530

From 1538 to 1540, Montmorency was entirely ascendant in the conduct of French foreign policy. He led France on a policy of reconciliation with the Holy Roman Emperor in the hopes that the Ducato di Milano (duchy of Milano) could be secured for France through diplomacy as opposed to war. Montmorency was not however naïve, and during this period instructed La Rochepot to ensure that the fortifications of Champagne and Picardie were in a good and complete state. La Rochepot was further to respond to any attempted incursions by Imperial forces.

The great favour La Rochepot's brother enjoyed, while certainly opening many doors to La Rochepot, did not mean Montmorency would always open the taps of royal funds to support La Rochepot's efforts to build his own clientèle. It would only be rarely that he intervened to ensure La Rochepot's men received offices. An example of this can be seen in his rebuffing of a 1548 request as concerned an appointment of a prévôt des maréchaux on the grounds it had already been granted to someone else.

At court, La Rochepot enjoyed the service of the influential courtier Genouillac with whom he maintained a correspondence and exchanged letters of recommendation.

=== Disgrace ===
In 1541, La Rochepot's brother was disgraced by the king, and departed court. During this period of disgrace, the future rivals of the Montmorency, the duc de Guise maintained warm relations both with Montmorency, and with La Rochepot.

On 21 May 1542, François revoked all of the charges to governates in the kingdom, thus dispossessing Montmorency of Languedoc and La Rochepot of the Île de France. He then proceeded to re-appoint all the other governors of the kingdom back to their former offices, with the exception of La Rochepot and Montmorency, thus achieving by a circuitous root an acceptable way to their honour to remove them from their powers. Vendôme assumed La Rochepot's charge in Paris.

As a reflection of Montmorency's disgrace, La Rochepot was first demoted to the lowest end of the list of gentilhomme de la chambre in 1544, before being removed from the position entirely in 1546. He was further dismissed from his responsibilities in Picardie, replaced first by Michel de Barbançon in June 1541 and then by Oudart du Biez, the governor of Boulogne.

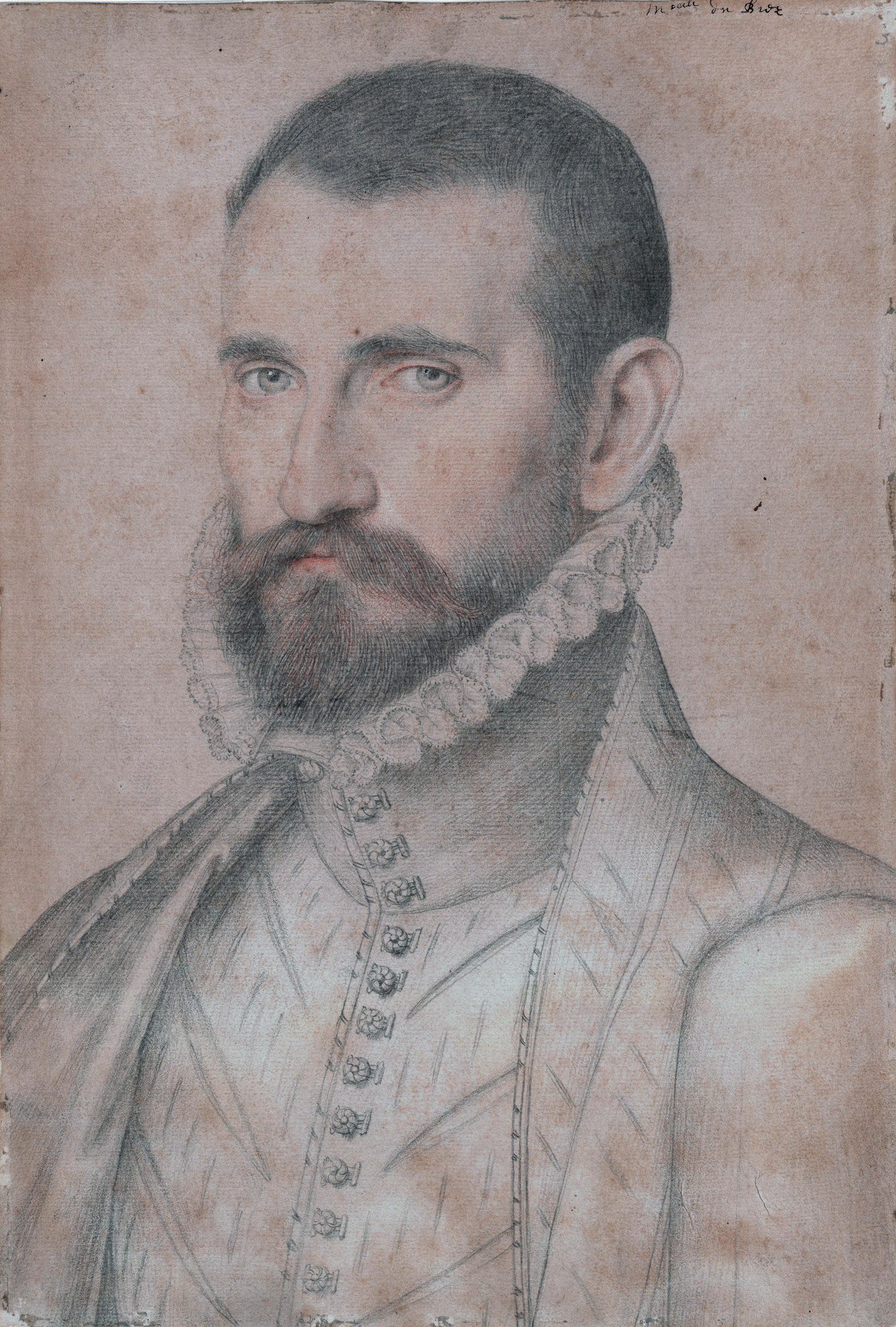
Oudard du Biez, Marshal of France and deputy governor of Picardie

He was not dispossessed of all military responsibilities however, and in 1544 was serving as a commander at Ardres. At this time he was otherwise commander of only his ordonnance company. He maintained his responsibilities as captain of Beauvais, however increasingly found his income going unpaid for the office, such that by 1546 it was two years in arrears. Indeed, his only recorded entries in the registers of Beauvais for these years are his protests at his lack of receipt for his captain's salary.

== Reign of Henri II ==
=== Return to the centre ===
The ascent of Henri II to the throne brought about a reverse in the fortunes of the Montmorency in April 1547. La Rochepot's older brother was restored to his governate of Languedoc, re-established with the authority of Constable and granted his backpay from the years of disgrace. La Rochepot meanwhile was restored to the Île de France and Paris on 12 April, likely with the consent of Vendôme who had exercised the charge during La Rochepot's disgrace. He also returned to the post of deputy governor of Picardie under the authority of Vendôme. La Rochepot further returned to the list of gentilhomme de la chambre, alongside many other clients and relatives of Montmorency.

While in Piemonte, word reached the king that a revolt had broken out against the gabelle (salt tax) in south-west France. Henri resolved to crush the revolt with force, and dispatched La Rochepot's brother as one pincer of an attack, up through Languedoc, while the duc d'Aumale travelled down through Poitou. The king explained this strategy in a letter to La Rochepot.

Informing La Rochepot was critical as it would be from Picardie, where he was deputy governor and thus the overall military commander, that many of the troops to crush the rebellion would be taken from.

In the coming years, La Rochepot would not always be present in Picardie to fulfil his charge of deputy governor (and therefore effective governor due to the pre-occupations of Vendôme). When he was absent first Martin du Bellay, and then Jean d'Estouteville were turned to by the king to assume his responsibilities on a temporary basis.

La Rochepot was frustrated by financial matters in Picardie during 1548, with Montreuil unable to support the garrison that they had currently been assigned. There were further issues with the behaviour of the troops themselves, with some like Sansac in a state of discontent. In response to the financial difficulties faced by garrison towns, in 1549 a new tax, known as the taillon was established to support the gendarmerie. The king wrote to La Rochepot asking him to get the towns under his authority to calculate the cost of supporting 100 men-at-arms. The magistrates of Péronne had other ideas however, deciding that they would prefer an increase in the taille to the new tax. This had the advantage to the towns of distributing the cost across France at large, with the tax largely targeting the less well off.

=== Boulogne campaign ===
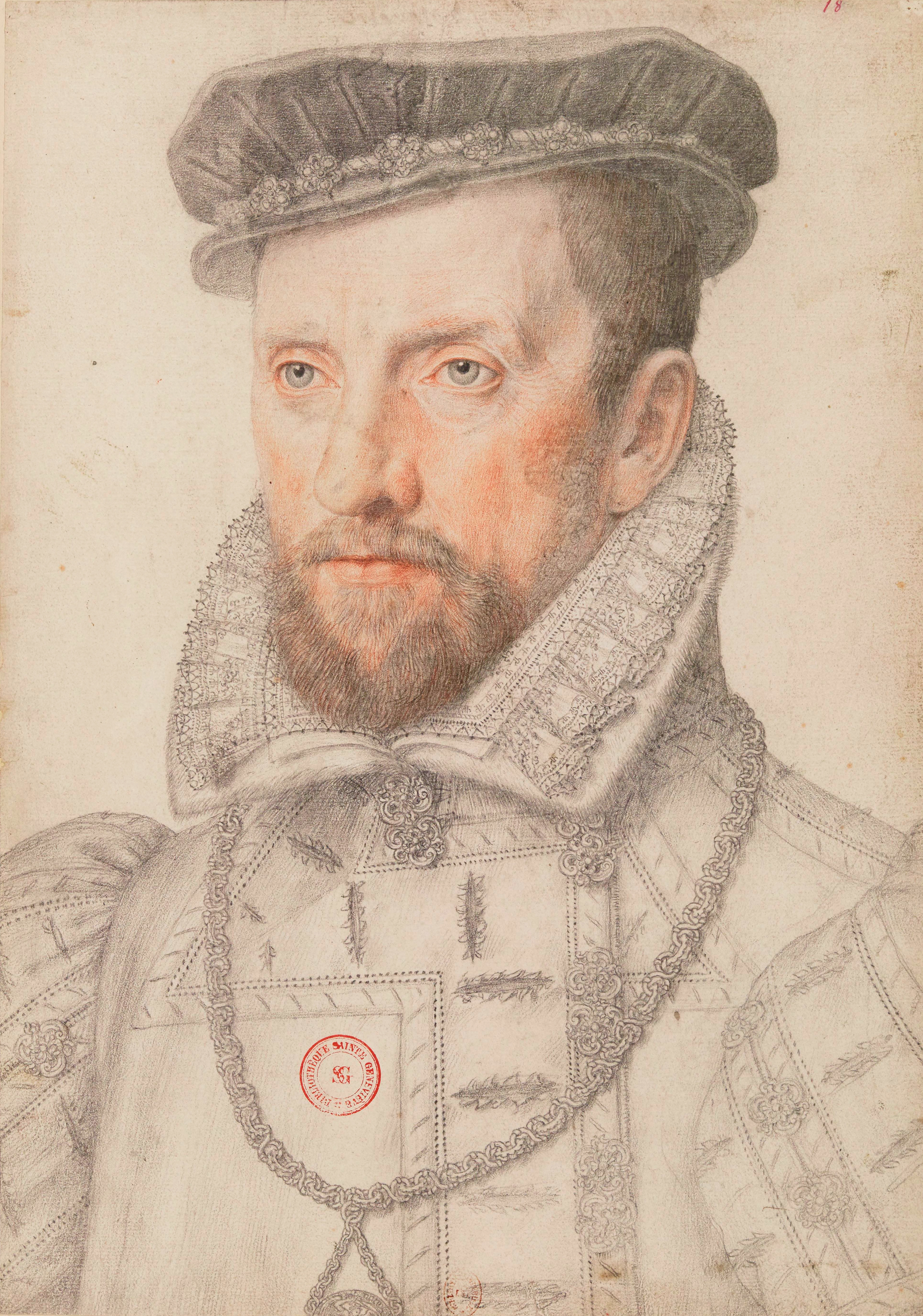
Gaspard II de Coligny, nephew of La Rochepot who played a key role in the Boulogne campaign alongside his uncle

As early as 1547, Henri had scouted out English held Boulogne, and vowed to oversee its recapture. To this end he granted the Constable full discretion in the steps used to undertake its recapture. Montmorency therefore had La Rochepot begin the stockpile of munitions. Meanwhile, La Rochepot's nephew Coligny was tasked with overseeing the construction of a new fort to overlook the English, known as fort Châtillon. La Rochepot was given carte-blanche as far as the establishment of captains in Picardie to raise troops for the campaign.

During the campaign against the English to recapture Boulogne, La Rochepot and his nephew Coligny rendezvoused with the duc d'Aumale at Montreuil in December 1549. On 8 January 1550, La Rochepot, Coligny, the secrétaire d'état (secretary of state) Guillaume Bochetel and councillor André Guillart were dispatched to negotiate with the ambassadors of Edward VI in England. Edward demanded 2,000,000 écus for the return of Boulogne to France, as per the treaty of 1545. Henri authorised the provision of 300,000 écus, and provided a financial file to La Rochepot which outlined the money France had already provided to England for its past debts from the captivity of François I. In the final treaty signed on 24 March 1550, Boulogne was returned to France for 400,000 écus.

On 25 April the English abandoned Boulogne, and La Rochepot and Coligny received the keys to the forts and town. Both men were surprised and delighted to see that the English had not cleared Boulogne of food, wine, munitions, powder or artillery. All these now fell into the French possession.

=== Death ===
When in 1551, La Rochepot made his entry into the hôtel de ville (town hall) of Paris, he was accompanied by an entourage of 30-40 gentleman as a show of his private power.

La Rochepot died on 20 August 1551 while at Péronne, he was succeeded as governor of the Île de France by his nephew Coligny. Coligny was to hold the office temporarily on the understanding La Rochepot's other nephew the Constable's eldest son would succeed to it in time.

He received a magnificent burial, a sarcophagus of marble with two figures laying on top while a copper ornamented canopy bore four marble figures of the virtues. It was destroyed in 1793 during the French Revolution.

=== Legacy ===
Potter discusses the relative obscurity of La Rochepot's career in comparison with that of his brother. He argues that due to Montmorency's prominence deriving from his royal favour as opposed to any other cause, that this made it harder for him to share the fruits of his prominence with his brother. Ultimately however Potter concludes that La Rochepot fulfilled a roll as his brothers agent in north-eastern France.

== Sources ==
- Cloulas, Ivan (1985). Henri II. Fayard.
- Durot, Éric (2012). François de Lorraine, duc de Guise entre Dieu et le Roi. Classiques Garnier. ISBN 9782812406102.
- Harding, Robert (1978). Anatomy of a Power Elite: the Provincial Governors in Early Modern France. Yale University Press.
- Knecht, Robert (1994). Renaissance Warrior and Patron: The Reign of Francis I. Cambridge University Press.
- Knecht, Robert (2014). Catherine de' Medici. Routledge.
- Knecht, Robert (2011). "Jacques de Genouillac, dit Galiot (V. 1465-1546)". In Michon, Cédric (ed.). Les Conseillers de François Ier. Presses Universitaires de Rennes.
- Nawrocki, François (2011). "Le Conseil de François Ier (1541-1547)". In Michon, Cédric (ed.). Les Conseillers de François Ier. Presses Universitaires de Rennes.
- Rentet, Thierry (2011). "Anne de Montmorency (1493-1567), Le Conseiller Médiocre". In Michon, Cédric (ed.). Les Conseillers de François Ier. Presses Universitaires de Rennes.
- Potter, David (1993). War and Government in the French Provinces: Picardy 1470-1560. Cambridge University Press.
- Potter, David (2004). "The Constable's brother: François de Montmorency, sieur de La Rochepot (c.1496-1551)". Nottingham Medieval Studies. 48: 141–197. doi:10.1484/J.NMS.3.364.
- Le Roux, Nicolas (2000). La Faveur du Roi: Mignons et Courtisans au Temps des Derniers Valois. Champ Vallon.
- Shimizu, J. (1970). Conflict of Loyalties: Politics and Religion in the Career of Gaspard de Coligny, Admiral of France, 1519–1572. Geneva: Librairie Droz.
