= Louis Amadeus Rappe =

Catholic bishop

His Excellency, The Right Reverend Louis Amadeus Rappe D.D.
- Bishop of Cleveland
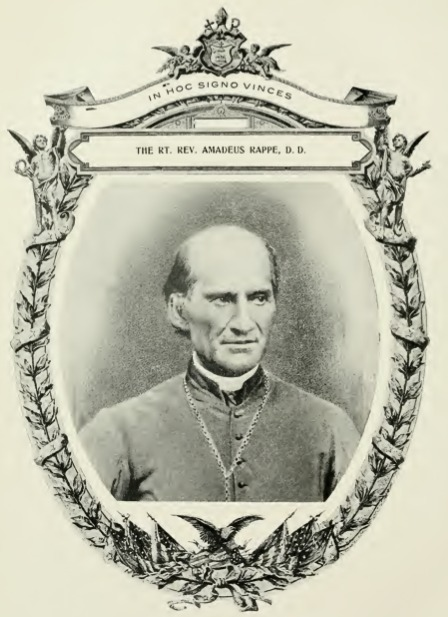
- Church: Roman Catholic Church
- See: Diocese of Cleveland
- In office: October 10, 1847– August 22, 1870
- Successor: Richard Gilmour

Orders
- Ordination: March 14, 1829 by Hugues de la Tour d'Auvergne-Lauragais
- Consecration: October 10, 1847 by John Baptist Purcell

Personal details
- Born: February 2, 1801 Audrehem, Pas-de-Calais, France
- Died: August 9, 1877 (aged 76) St. Albans, Vermont, USA
- Buried: Resurrection Chapel, St. John Cathedral, Cleveland, Ohio US
- Motto: In hoc signo vinces (In this sign, thou shall conquer)

Louis Amadeus Rappe (February 2, 1801 – August 9, 1877) was a French-born prelate of the Roman Catholic Church. He served as the first bishop of the new Diocese of Cleveland in Ohio from 1847 to 1870.

== Biography ==
=== Early life ===
Louis Rappe was born on February 2, 1801, in Audrehem, Pas-de-Calais, in France to Eloi and Marie Antoinette (née Noël) Rappe, a farm family. He was one of ten children and labored in the fields until October 1820, when he entered the Haffreingue-Chanclaire College in Boulogne, France, under the instruction of Reverend Benoit Haffreingue. After graduating in 1826, Rappe attended the seminary in Arras, France.

=== Priesthood ===
Rappe was ordained to the priesthood for the Diocese of Arras in France by then Bishop Hugues de la Tour 'Auvergne-Lauragais on March 14, 1829. After his ordination, Rappe served as a pastor in a parish in Wismes, France. In 1834, he was appointed chaplain to the Ursuline monastery in Boulogne.

In 1839, Bishop John Purcell escorted three young women from England to the monastery in Boulogne. Already interested in going to the United States, Rappe offered his service to Purcell. Although concerned about Rappe's inability to speak English, Purcell recruited him to be incardinated, or transferred into the Diocese of Cincinnati in Ohio. After arriving in Ohio in October 1840, Purcell sent Rappe to Chillicothe, Ohio for six months to learn English from the scholar William Anderson.

For his first pastoral assignment, Purcell appointed Rappe as pastor of St. Francis de Sales Parish, based in Toledo, Ohio. However, the unofficial parish limits extended from Toledo west to the Indiana border and as far south as Allen County, Ohio. Rappe ministered to the Catholic laborers on the Miami and Erie Canal and the settlers along the Maumee River, both in Ohio. Concerned about the high degree of alcohol dependency among the laborers and its effects on families, Rappe frequently preached to them about the benefits of temperance.

Rappe arranged for the School Sisters of Notre Dame to enter the diocese, building a convent and school for them. In 1842, Reverend Louis De Goesbriand was assigned to Rappe as an assistant. Contemporary accounts described Rappe as being genial and affable and as an enthusiastic catechism teacher for children. He also established good relationships with Protestant pastors in the area.

=== Bishop of Cleveland ===
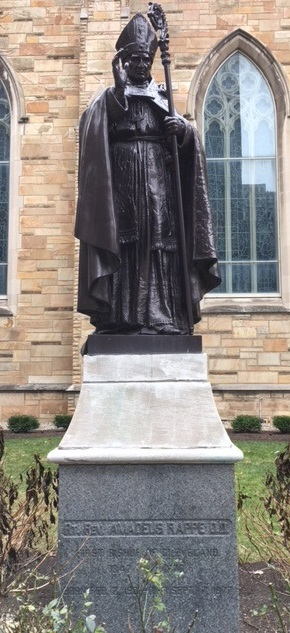
Statue of Bishop Rappe outside St. John's Cathedral (2017)

On April 23, 1847, Rappe was appointed the first bishop of the newly created Diocese of Cleveland by Pope Pius IX. He received his episcopal consecration at the Cathedral of Saint Peter in Chains in Cincinnati, Ohio, on October 10, 1847, from Purcell, with Bishop Richard Whelan serving as a co-consecrator.

Two days after his consecration, Rappe published his first pastoral letter, in which he expressed his desire "to be regarded as your friend and father, rather than your superior." At that time, the diocese contained 42 churches and 21 priests; the first and only Catholic church in Cleveland was St. Mary's on the Flats. He soon established the city's first parochial school, which doubled as a chapel.

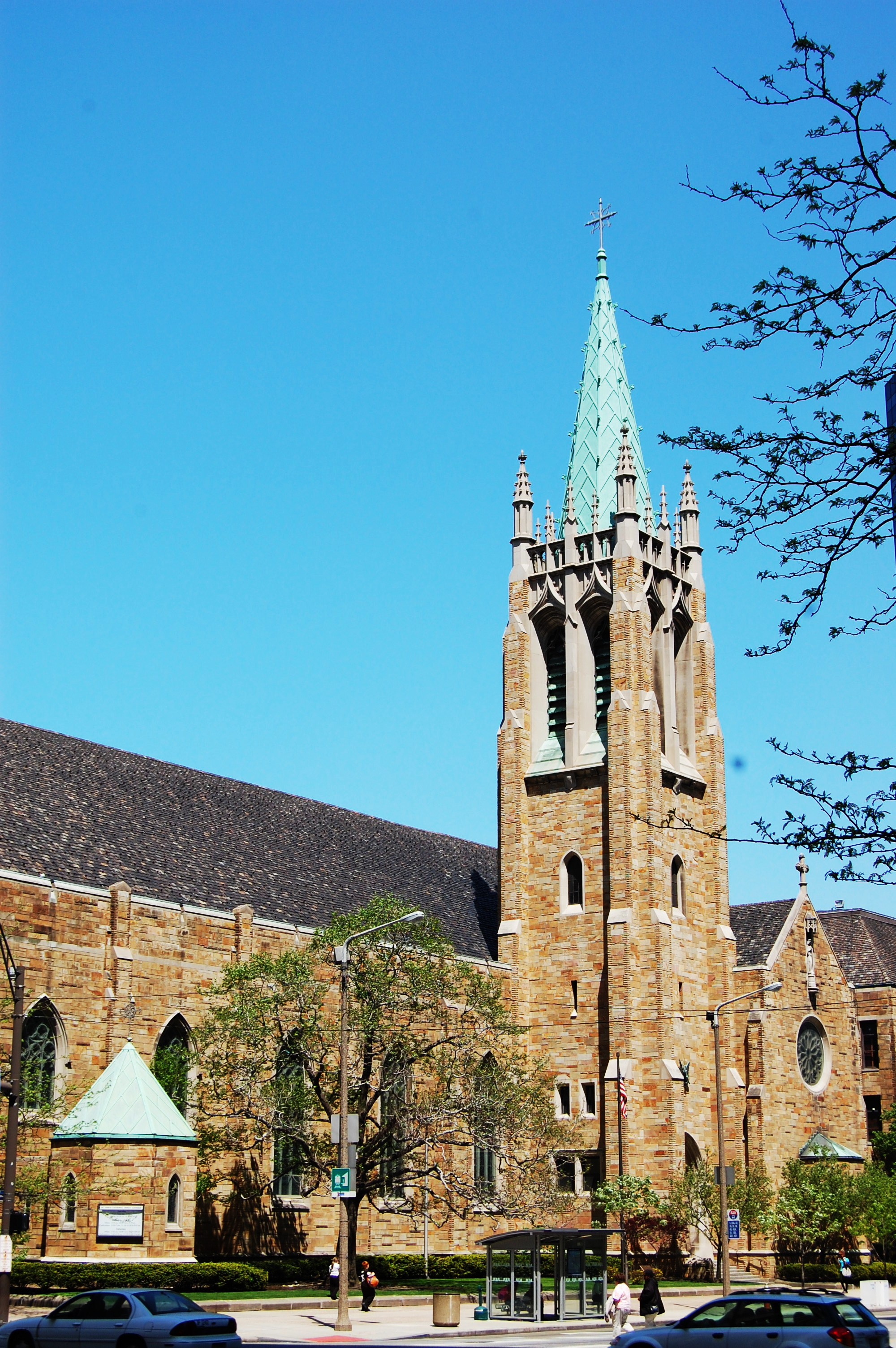
St. John's Cathedral, Cleveland, Ohio (2010)

Rappe purchased an episcopal residence in 1848, founding a seminary there. He laid the cornerstone of St. John's Cathedral on October 22, 1848. In 1849, Rappe went to Europe to recruit clergy for the diocese. He returned in 1850 with four priests, five seminarians, two Sisters of Charity and six Ursuline nuns. The Daughters of the Immaculate Heart of Mary opened St. Mary's Orphan Asylum for Females in 1851. Rappe consecrated St. John's Cathedral on November 7, 1852. The Sisters of Charity opened St. Vincent's Asylum for Boys in 1852. He also introduced into the diocese the Grey Nuns in 1856.

In 1865, Rappe established St. Vincent Charity Hospital, the first public hospital in Cleveland. He brought in the Good Shepherd Sisters (1869), the Little Sisters of the Poor (1870), the Friars Minor (1867) and the Jesuits (1869), and organized the Sisters of Charity of St. Augustine as a new congregation.

=== Retirement and legacy ===
With his eyesight failing, Rappe submitted his resignation as bishop of Cleveland after returning to Ohio from First Vatican Council in 1870. Pope Pius IX accepted his resignation on August 22, 1870. Rappe left the diocese with more than 100,000 Catholics, 107 priests, 160 churches, and 90 schools.

After his resignation, Rappe moved to St. Albans, Vermont, where he supervised missions in Vermont and Canada for the Diocese of Burlington. The pope later offered him another diocese, but Rappe declined it. Louis Rapp died at St. Albans on September 8, 1877, at the age of 76. He was interred in St. John's Cathedral in Cleveland.

Catholic Church titles
New title Newly-erected	Roman Catholic Bishop of Cleveland; 1847–1870	Succeeded by Richard Gilmour
