= Hauteville, Pas-de-Calais =

Hauteville
- Commune
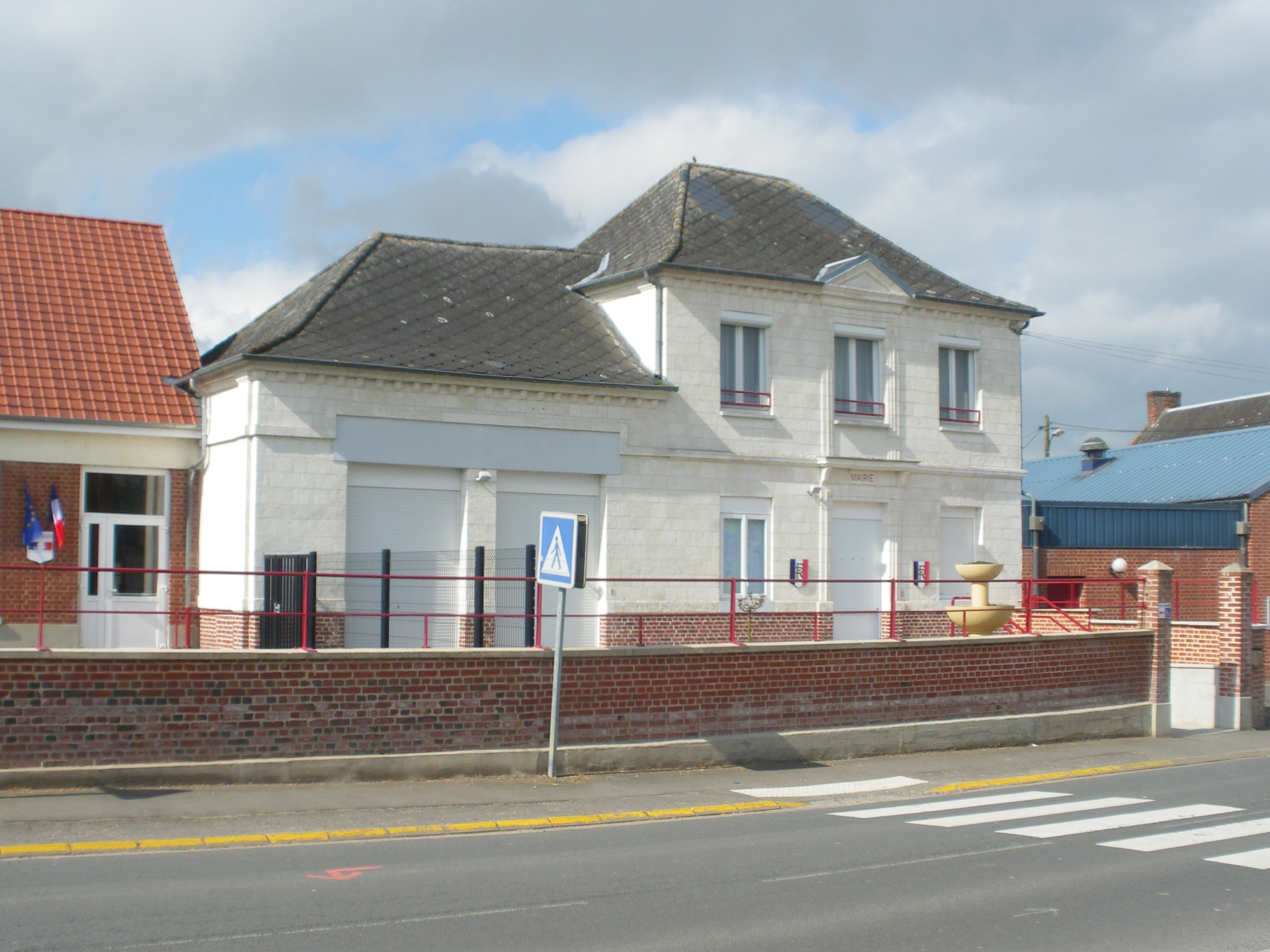
- The town hall of Hauteville

- Coat of arms
- Location of Hauteville
- Location within France Location within Hauts-de-France
- Coordinates: 50°16′23″N 2°34′26″E
- Country: France
- Region: Hauts-de-France
- Department: Pas-de-Calais
- Arrondissement: Arras
- Canton: Avesnes-le-Comte
- Intercommunality: CC Campagnes de l'Artois

Government
  - Mayor (2020–2026): Jean-Pierre Marocchini
- Area^{1}: 4.06 km^{2} (1.57 sq mi)
- Elevation: 133 m (436 ft)
- Highest elevation: 137 m (449 ft)
- Lowest elevation: 95 m (312 ft)
- Population (2023): 308
  - Density: 75.9/km^{2} (196/sq mi)
- Time zone: UTC+01:00 (CET)
  - Summer (DST): UTC+02:00 (CEST)
- INSEE/Postal code: 62418 /62810
- ^{1} French Land Register data, which excludes lakes, ponds, glaciers > 1 km^{2} (0.386 sq mi or 247 acres) and river estuaries.

Hauteville (French pronunciation: [otvil]) is a commune in the Pas-de-Calais department in the Hauts-de-France region of France.

== Geography ==
A farming village situated 11 miles (18 km) west of Arras, at the junction of the D66 and the D68 roads.

== Population ==
Historical population
Year	Pop.	±% p.a.
1968	223	—
1975	210	−0.85%
1982	237	+1.74%
1990	255	+0.92%
1999	248	−0.31%
2007	282	+1.62%
2012	315	+2.24%
2017	316	+0.06%
2023	308	−0.43%
Source: INSEE

== Places of interest ==
- The 19th-century chateau
- The church of St. Christophe, dating from the 16th century

== See also ==
- Communes of the Pas-de-Calais department
