= Wismes =

Wismes Wijme
- Commune
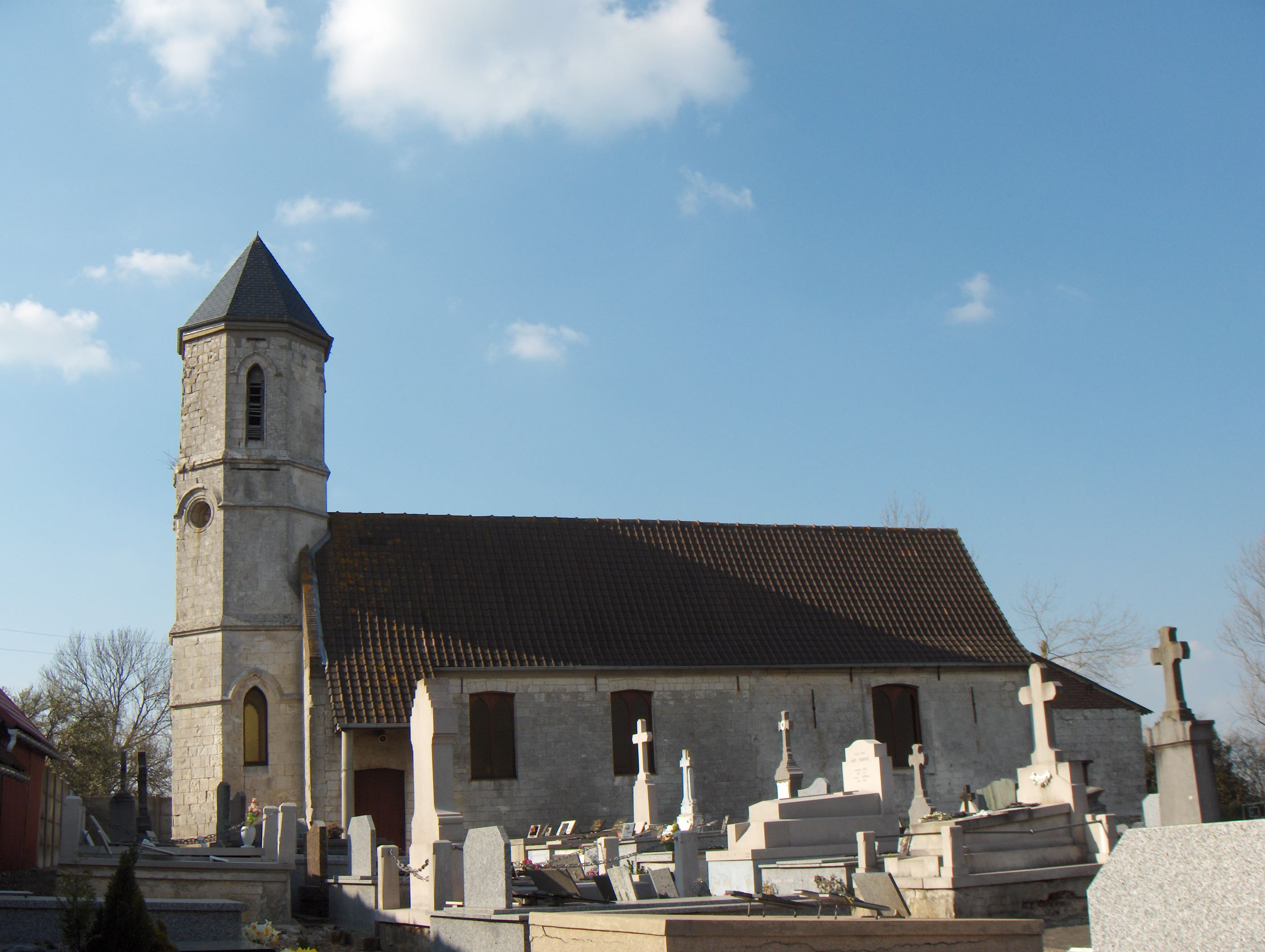
- The church of Wismes

- Coat of arms
- Location of Wismes
- Location within France Location within Hauts-de-France
- Coordinates: 50°39′17″N 2°04′19″E
- Country: France
- Region: Hauts-de-France
- Department: Pas-de-Calais
- Arrondissement: Saint-Omer
- Canton: Lumbres
- Intercommunality: Pays de Lumbres

Government
  - Mayor (2020–2026): Sandrine Merlo
- Area^{1}: 11.93 km^{2} (4.61 sq mi)
- Elevation: 128 m (420 ft)
- Highest elevation: 191 m (627 ft)
- Lowest elevation: 73 m (240 ft)
- Population (2023): 492
  - Density: 41.2/km^{2} (107/sq mi)
- Time zone: UTC+01:00 (CET)
  - Summer (DST): UTC+02:00 (CEST)
- INSEE/Postal code: 62897 /62380
- ^{1} French Land Register data, which excludes lakes, ponds, glaciers > 1 km^{2} (0.386 sq mi or 247 acres) and river estuaries.

Wismes (French pronunciation: [wim]; West Flemish: Wijme; older Dutch: Wijme) is a commune in the Pas-de-Calais department, region of Hauts-de-France, northern France.

== Geography ==
Wismes is located twelve miles (19 km) southwest of Saint-Omer, at the D132 and D205 road junction, comprising the villages and hamlets of Wismes, Cantemerle, Fourdebecques, Marival, Rietz-Mottu, Saint-Pierre-Wismes and Salvecques.

== Population ==
Historical population
Year	Pop.	±% p.a.
1968	446	—
1975	435	−0.36%
1982	449	+0.45%
1990	497	+1.28%
1999	525	+0.61%
2007	511	−0.34%
2012	504	−0.28%
2017	491	−0.52%
2023	492	+0.03%
Source: INSEE

== Places of interest ==
- The church of St. André, dating from the sixteenth century
- The church of St.Pierre, dating from the seventeenth century
- A small château of the Louis XV style
- The remains of a 12th-century feudal motte

== Notable people ==
- Baron Armel de Wismes, writer and historian
- Louis Amadeus Rappe, the Bishop of Cleveland, Ohio, United States, served as the pastor of Wismes from 1829 to 1834.

== See also ==
- Communes of the Pas-de-Calais department
