= Montépilloy =

- Commune
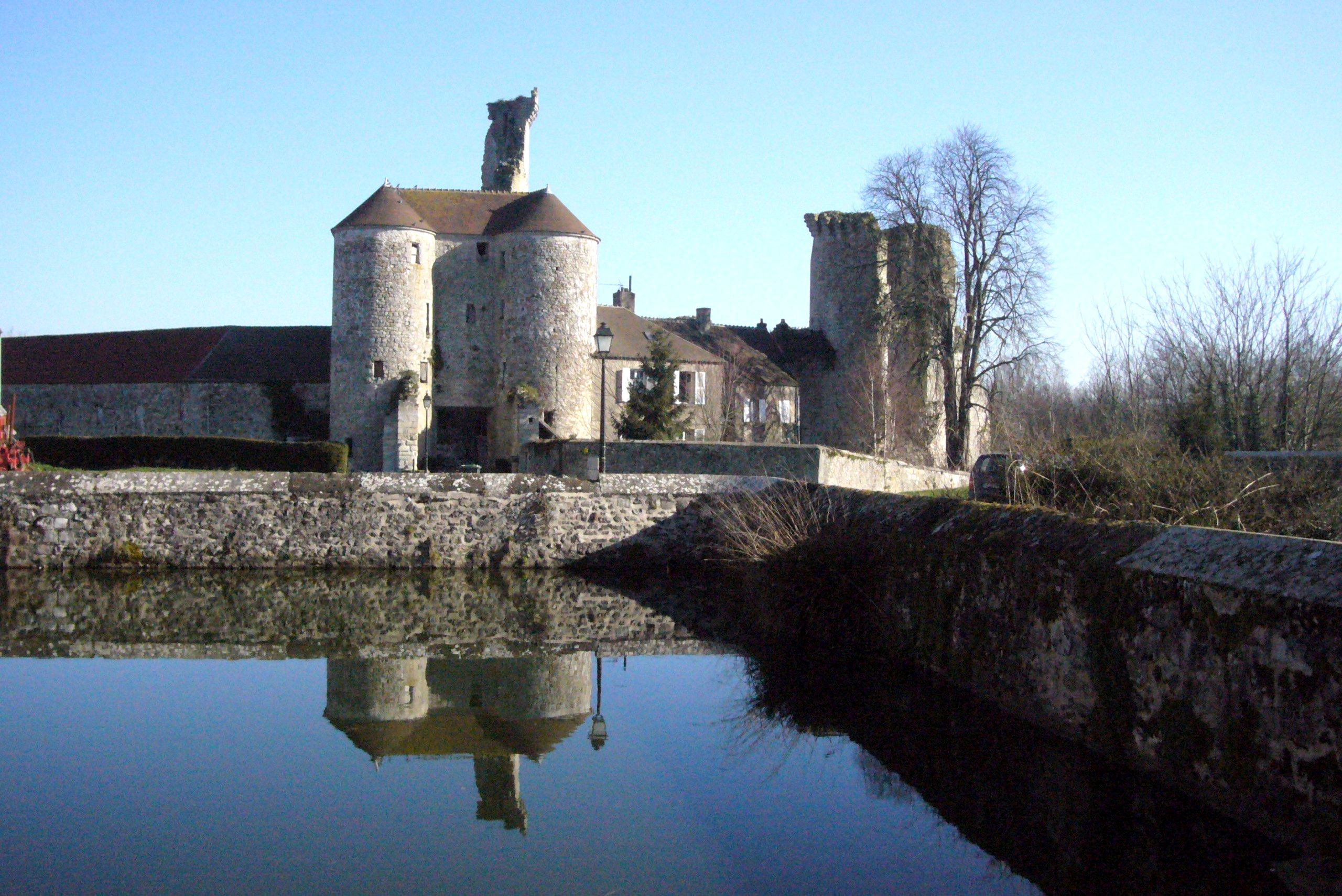
- The chateau in Montépilloy
- Location of Montépilloy
- Location within France Location within Hauts-de-France
- Coordinates: 49°12′36″N 2°41′56″E
- Country: France
- Region: Hauts-de-France
- Department: Oise
- Arrondissement: Senlis
- Canton: Pont-Sainte-Maxence

Government
  - Mayor (2020–2026): Laurent Blot
- Area^{1}: 5.86 km^{2} (2.26 sq mi)
- Elevation: 132 m (433 ft)
- Highest elevation: 147 m (482 ft)
- Lowest elevation: 84 m (276 ft)
- Population (2023): 159
  - Density: 27.1/km^{2} (70.3/sq mi)
- Time zone: UTC+01:00 (CET)
  - Summer (DST): UTC+02:00 (CEST)
- INSEE/Postal code: 60415 /60810
- ^{1} French Land Register data, which excludes lakes, ponds, glaciers > 1 km^{2} (0.386 sq mi or 247 acres) and river estuaries.

Montépilloy (French pronunciation: [mɔ̃tepilwa]) is a commune in the Oise department in northern France.

== See also ==
- Communes of the Oise department
