= Proto-Cubism =

Phase in art history

Pablo Picasso, 1909, Brick Factory at Tortosa (Briqueterie à Tortosa, L'Usine, Factory at Horta de Ebro), oil on canvas. 50.7 × 60.2 cm, (Source entry State Museum of New Western Art, Moscow) The State Hermitage Museum, Saint Petersburg

Proto-Cubism (also referred to as Protocubism, Early Cubism, and Pre-Cubism or Précubisme) is an intermediary transition phase in the history of art chronologically extending from 1906 to 1910. Evidence suggests that the production of proto-Cubist paintings resulted from a wide-ranging series of experiments, circumstances, influences and conditions, rather than from one isolated static event, trajectory, artist or discourse. With its roots stemming from at least the late 19th century, this period is characterized by a move towards the radical geometrization of form and a reduction or limitation of the color palette (in comparison with Fauvism). It is essentially the first experimental and exploratory phase of an art movement that would become altogether more extreme, known from the spring of 1911 as Cubism.

Proto-Cubist artworks typically depict objects in geometric schemas of cubic or conic shapes. The illusion of classical perspective is progressively stripped away from objective representation to reveal the constructive essence of the physical world (not just as seen). The term is applied not only to works of this period by Georges Braque and Pablo Picasso, but to a range of art produced in France during the early 1900s, by such artists as Juan Gris, Jean Metzinger, Albert Gleizes, Henri Le Fauconnier, Robert Delaunay, Fernand Léger, and to variants developed elsewhere in Europe. Proto-Cubist works embrace many disparate styles, and would affect diverse individuals, groups and movements, ultimately forming a fundamental stage in the history of modern art of the 20th-century.

== History and influences ==
The building blocks that led to the construction of proto-Cubist works are diverse in nature. Neither homogeneous nor isotropic, the progression of each individual artist was unique. The influences that characterize this transition period range from Post-Impressionism, to Symbolism, Les Nabis and Neo-Impressionism, the works of Paul Cézanne, Georges Seurat, Paul Gauguin to African, Egyptian, Greek, Micronesian, Native American, Iberian sculpture, and Iberian schematic art.

In anticipation of Proto-Cubism the idea of form inherent in art since the Renaissance had been questioned. The romanticist Eugène Delacroix, the realist Gustave Courbet, and practically all the Impressionists had abandoned a significant portion of Classicism in favor of immediate sensation. The dynamic expression favored by these artists presented a challenge in contrast to the static means of expression promoted by the Academia. The representation of fixed objects occupying a space, was replaced by dynamic colors and form in constant evolution. Yet other means would be necessary to jettison completely the long-standing foundation that surrounded them. While the freedom of Impressionism had certainly jeopardized its integrity, it would take another generation of artists, not just to bring the edifice down piece by piece, but to rebuild an entirely new configuration, cube by cube.

=== Cézanne ===
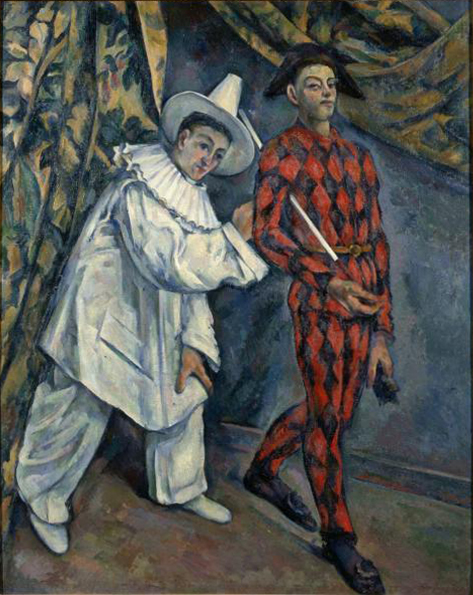
Paul Cézanne, 1888, Mardi gras (Pierot and Harlequin), oil on canvas, 102 cm × 81 cm (40 in × 32 in), Pushkin Museum, Moscow

Several predominant factors mobilized the shift from a more representational art form to one that would become increasingly abstract; one of the most important would be found directly within the works of Paul Cézanne and exemplified in a widely discussed letter addressed to Émile Bernard dated 15 April 1904. Cézanne ambiguously writes: "Interpret nature in terms of the cylinder, the sphere, the cone; put everything in perspective, so that each side of an object, of a plane, recedes toward a central point."

In addition to his preoccupation for the simplification of geometric structure, Cézanne was concerned with the means of rendering the effect of volume and space. His rather classical color-modulating system consisted of changing colors from warm to cool as the object turns away from the source of light. Cézanne's departure from classicism, however, would be best summarized in the treatment and of application of the paint itself; a process in which his brushstrokes played an important role. The complexity of surface variations (or modulations) with overlapped shifting planes, seemingly arbitrary contours, contrasts and values combined to produce a strong patchwork effect. Increasingly in his later works, as Cézanne achieves a greater freedom, the patchwork becomes larger, bolder, more arbitrary, more dynamic and increasingly abstract. As the color planes acquire greater formal independence, defined objects and structures begin to lose their identity.

The art critic Louis Vauxcelles acknowledged the importance of Cézanne to the Cubists in his article titled From Cézanne to Cubism (published in Eclair, 1920). For Vauxcelles the influence had a two-fold character, both 'architectural' and 'intellectual'. He stressed the statement made by Émile Bernard that Cézanne's optics were "not in the eye, but in his brain".

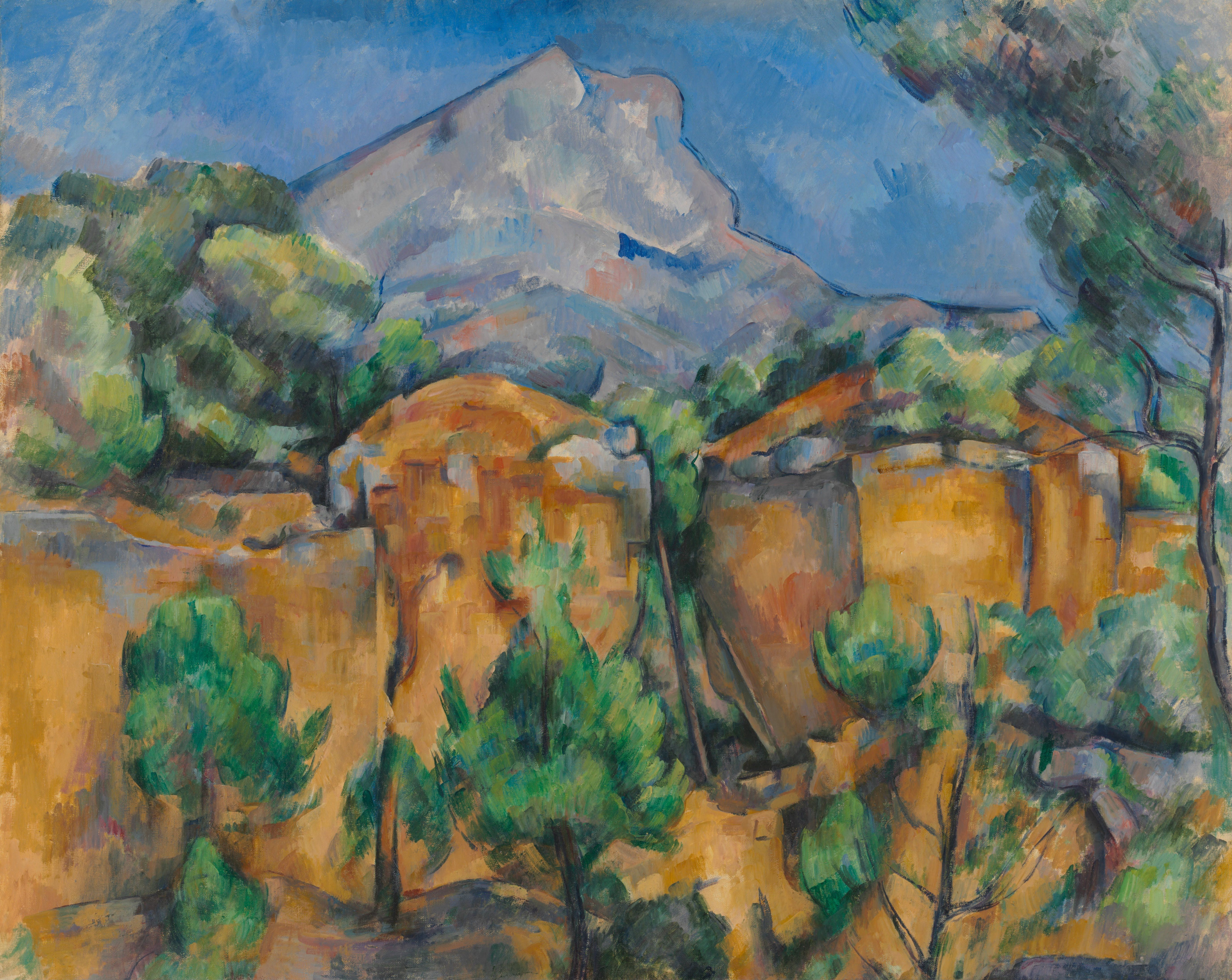
Paul Cézanne, c. 1897, Mont Sainte-Victoire seen from the Bibémus Quarry, oil on canvas, 65 × 81 cm, Baltimore Museum of Art. In order to express the mountain's grandeur, Cézanne manipulated the scene by painting the mountain twice as large as it would have appeared, and tipped forward so that it would rise up rather than slope backwards

With both his courage and experience to draw from, Cézanne created a hybrid art-form. He combined on the one hand the imitative and the immobile, a system left over from the Renaissance, and the mobile on the other; together to forming a hybrid. His own generation would see in his contradictory codes nothing more than impotence, unaware of his intentions. However, the next generation would see in Cézanne greatness, precisely because of this duality. Cézanne was seen simultaneously as a classicist by those who chose to see in his work the imitation of nature and perspective, and as a revolutionary by those who saw in him a revolt against imitation and classical perspective. Timid, yet clearly manifest, was the will to deconstruct. Artists at the forefront of the Parisian art scene at the outset of the 20th century would not fail to notice these tendencies inherent in the work of Cézanne, and decided to venture still further.

Avant-garde artists in Paris (including Jean Metzinger, Albert Gleizes, Henri Le Fauconnier, Robert Delaunay, Pablo Picasso, Fernand Léger, André Lhote, Othon Friesz, Georges Braque, Raoul Dufy, Maurice de Vlaminck, Alexander Archipenko and Joseph Csaky) had begun reevaluating their own work in relation to that of Cézanne. A retrospective of Cézanne's paintings had been held at the Salon d'Automne of 1904. Current works were exhibited at the Salon d'Automne of 1905 and 1906, followed by two commemorative retrospectives after his death in 1907. The influence generated by the work of Cézanne suggests a means by which some of these artist made the transition from Post-Impressionism, Neo-Impressionism, Divisionism and Fauvism to Cubism.

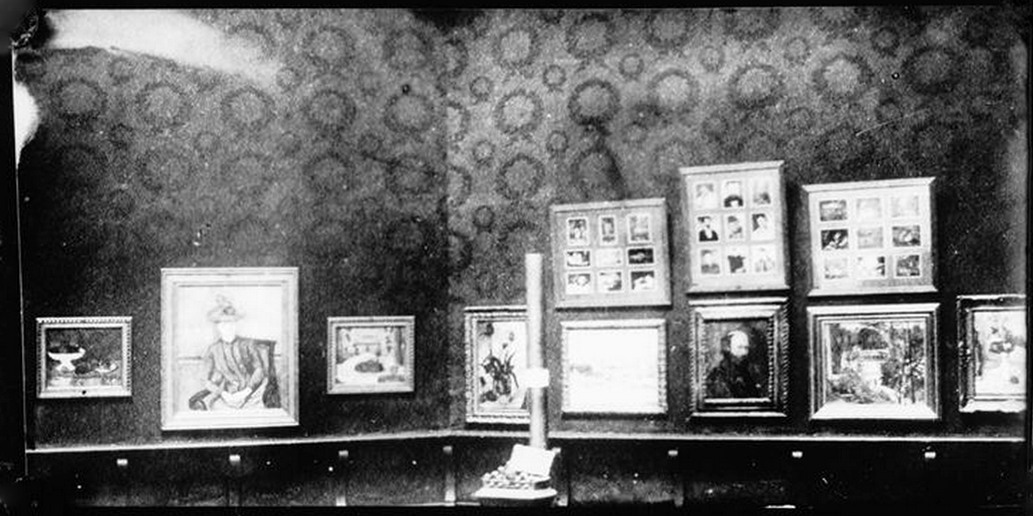
View of the Salon d'Automne, 1904, Salle Cézanne (Pommes et gâteaux, Mme Cézanne au chapeau vert, le plat de pommes, le vase de tulipes, etc.) photograph by Ambroise Vollard

Cézanne syntax didn't just ripple outwards over the sphere, touching those that would become Cubists in France, Futurists in Italy and Die Brücke, Der Blaue Reiter, Expressionists in Germany, it also created currents that flowed throughout Parisian art world threatening to destabilize (if not topple) at least three of the core foundations of the academia: the geometrical method of perspective used to create the illusion of form, space and depth since the Renaissance; Figuratism, derived from real object sources (and therefore representational), and aesthetics. At the time, it was assumed that all art aims at beauty, and anything that wasn't beautiful couldn't be counted as art. The proto-Cubists revolted against the concept that objective beauty was central to the definition of art.

=== Symbolism ===
In his Sources of Cubism and Futurism, art historian Daniel Robbins reviews the Symbolist roots of modern art, exploring the literary source of both Cubist painting in France and Futurism in Italy. The revolution of free verse with which Gustave Kahn was associated, was a principle example of the correspondence between progress in art and politics; a growing conviction among young artists. Filippo Tommaso Marinetti acknowledged his indebtedness to it, as a source of modern artistic liberty. "Paul Fort's Parisian review Vers et Prose", writes Robbins, "as well as the Abbaye de Créteil, cradle of both Jules Romains's Unanimism and Henri-Martin Barzun's Dramatisme, had emphasized the importance of this new formal device". Kahn's free verse was revolutionary because, in his own words, "free verse is mobile, like mobile perspective". In classical French poetry, writes Robbins, "meaning and rhythm were united, and sense and rhythm stopped simultaneously. The unity consisted in the number and rhythm of vowels and consonants together forming an organic and independent cell". The system began to break down, according to Kahn, with the Romantic poets when they permitted a stop for the ear, with no stop in meaning. This is akin to Jacques Villon's drawings and prints of 1908 and 1909, notes Robbins, "where the hatching lines that create a shape do not stop at the contour, but continue beyond, taking on an independent life".

The next step, wrote Kahn, was to impart unity and cohesion by means of a union of related consonants, or the repetition of similar vowel sounds (assonance). Poets were thus free to create novel and complex rhythms, with, if so desired, inversions that destroyed the beat of the strophe. As Kahn noted, this was shocking because traditionally it was the regularity of the strophe that gave the reader meaning. Symbolist concepts vacated the metronome-like symmetry and introduced liberty, flexibility and elasticity. Each was to find her own rhythmic force. The classicists feared that the dismantling of meter by the decadent Symbolist 'barbarians' would undermine the French language, and thus attack the very foundations of social order.

Elasticity, one of Kahn's favorite words used to describe free verse, would become the title of well known Futurist works by Umberto Boccioni, as well as two paintings by Roger de La Fresnaye, a proto-Cubist work and later a cubist work entitled Marie Ressort (ressort meaning elasticity or spring). These paintings, writes Robbins, are an homage to the prose of Jules Laforgue, whose poems concerned the life of his sister Marie.

==== Pablo Picasso ====
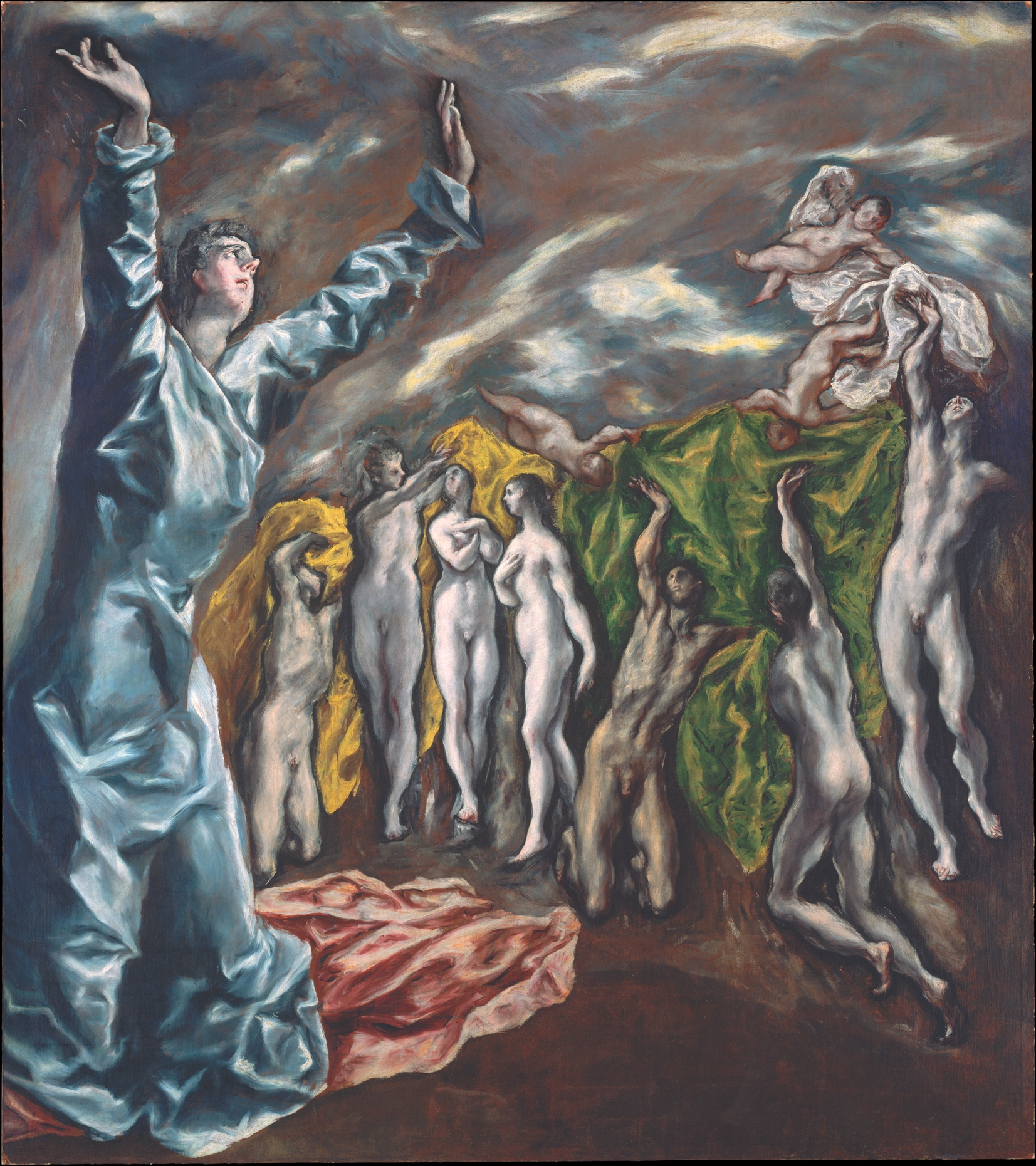
El Greco, The Opening of the Fifth Seal (c.1609–1614, oil, 224.8 × 199.4 cm, Metropolitan Museum of Art) has been suggested to be the prime source of inspiration for Picasso's Les Demoiselles d'Avignon.

Picasso's Les Demoiselles d'Avignon (1907, oil on canvas, 243.9 × 233.7 cm, Museum of Modern Art) appears to have certain morphological and stylistic similarities with The Opening of the Fifth Seal.

In 1899 Picasso rejected academic study and joined a circle of avant-garde artists and writers known as Modernistes (or decadentes). Meeting at Els Quatre Gats in Barcelona, they assimilated trends such as symbolism and Art Nouveau, characterized by contour lines, simplified form and unnatural colors. Yet, in addition to the influence of Théophile Steinlen and Henri de Toulouse-Lautrec, that of Francisco Goya and El Greco can be seen in Picasso's work of the period. A significant innovation of El Greco's later works is the interweaving of form and space; a reciprocal relationship is developed between the two that unifies the painted surface. This interweaving would re-emerge three centuries later in the works of Cézanne and Picasso. Adapting these style, the artist produced numerous portraits of friends such as Carlos Casagemas and Jaime Sabartès (Sabartès Seated). The modernists also devoted themselves to political anarchy and other social causes, including sympathy for the poor, denizens and the underclass; subjects that would soon emerge in the paintings of Picasso's Blue Period (a color associated with despair and melancholy, blue was commonly used in Symbolist painting).

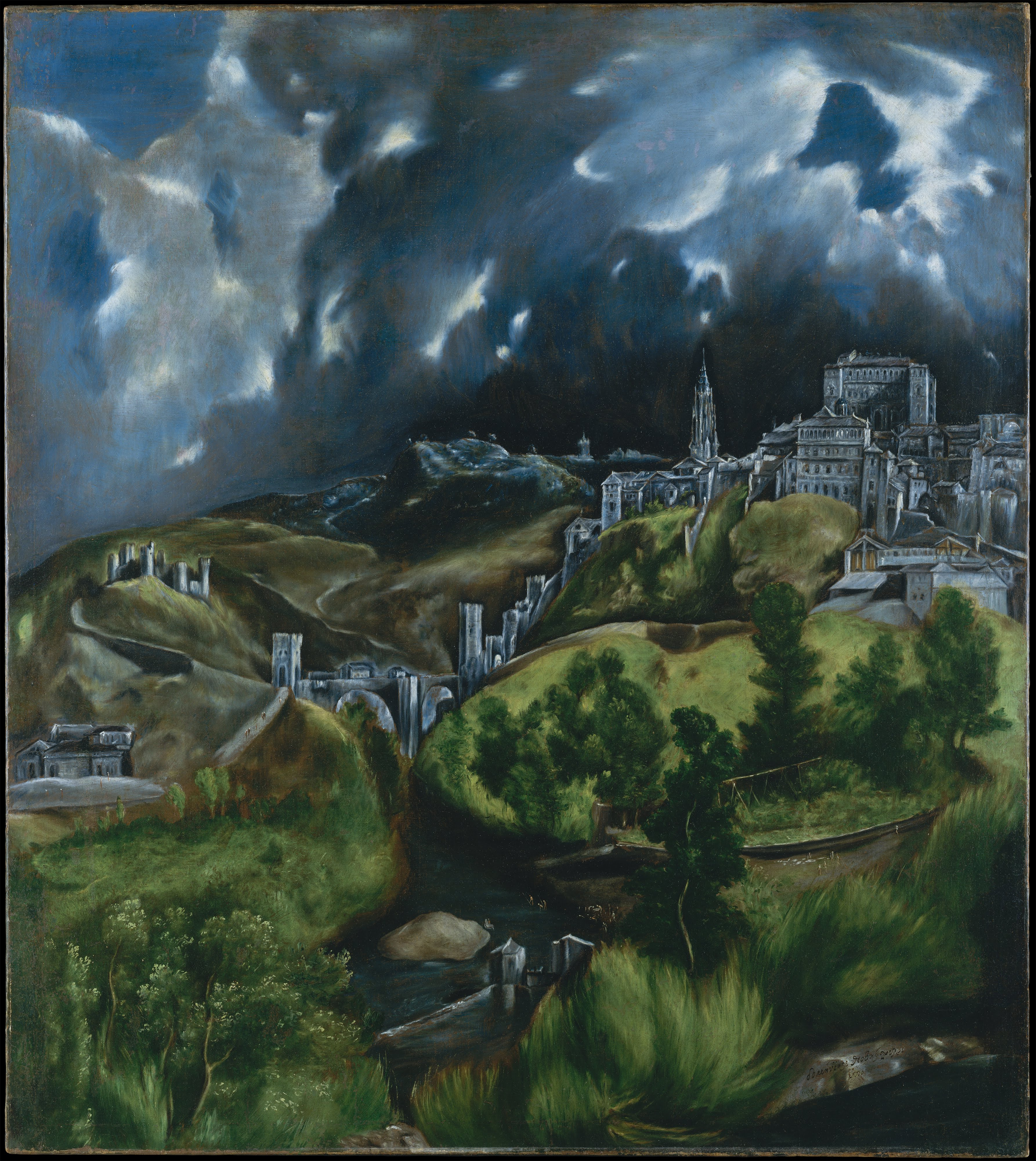
El Greco, c. 1595–1600, View of Toledo, oil on canvas, 47.75 × 42.75 cm, Metropolitan Museum of Art, New York. This work has a striking resemblance to 20th-century Expressionism. Historically, however, it is an example of Mannerism.

The first artist who seems to have noticed the structural code built into the morphology of late El Greco was Paul Cézanne, one of the forerunners of Cubism. Comparative morphological analyses of the two painters works reveal common elements: the distortion of the human body, the reddish and unworked backgrounds, and the similarities in the rendering of space. According to Brown, "Cézanne and El Greco are spiritual brothers despite the centuries which separate them". Fry observed that Cézanne drew from "his great discovery of the permeation of every part of the design with a uniform and continuous plastic theme".

In 1904 Picasso moved to Paris, where the work of post-impressionist painters Van Gogh, Cézanne, Seurat, Gauguin were exhibited at galleries and Salons. Rapidly assimilating these influences, he adapted to new styles and techniques, as the use of bright unmixed colors.

The Symbolists, and Pablo Picasso during his Blue Period, drew on the cool tonality of El Greco and the anatomy of his ascetic figures. While Picasso was working on Les Demoiselles d'Avignon, he visited his friend Ignacio Zuloaga in his Parisian atelier and studied El Greco's Opening of the Fifth Seal (owned by Zuloaga since 1897). The relation between Les Demoiselles d'Avignon and the Opening of the Fifth Seal was pinpointed in the early 1980s, when the stylistic similarities and the relationship between the motifs of both works were analysed. Art historian Ron Johnson was the first to focus on the relationship between the two paintings. According to John Richardson, Les Demoiselles d'Avignon "turns out to have a few more answers to give once we realize that the painting owes at least as much to El Greco as Cézanne".

Picasso's Rose Period turns toward the theme of the fairground and circus performers; subjects often depicted in Post-Impressionist, romantic and symbolist art and verse (from Baudelaire and Rimbaud to Daumier and Seurat), where melancholy and social alienation pervade the saltimbanque. Corresponding to the tone of Picasso, acrobats represent both mystery and enchantment in the poems of Guillaume Apollinaire written in the same period.

In 1906, working at the Bateau Lavoir, Picasso continued to explore new directions; portraying monumental female figures standing in abstract interior spaces. Now, in addition to the bathers of Cézanne, Spanish romanesque art and Iberian sculpture provide a prominent influences for Picasso. Around this time he also created a self-portrait depicting himself as something of a latter-day Cézanne.

==== Albert Gleizes ====
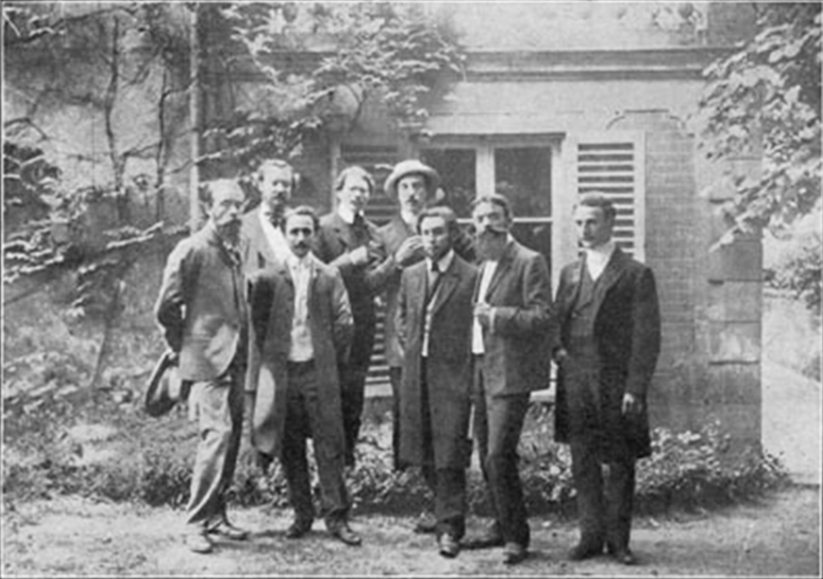
Abbaye de Créteil, c. 1908. First row: Charles Vildrac, René Arcos, Albert Gleizes, Barzun, Alexandre Mercereau. Second row: Georges Duhamel, Berthold Mahn, d'Otémar

The proto-Cubism of Albert Gleizes too bares its roots in Symbolism. In his father's Montmartre workshop (around 1899), Gleizes joins a childhood friend, the poet René Arcos. In Amiens (1904) he meets the painters Berthold Mahn, Jacques d'Otémar and Josué Gaboriaud, as well as the printer, Lucien Linard, who will soon run the printshop at the Abbaye de Créteil. At the same time, through Jean Valmy Baysse, an art critic (and soon historian of the Comédie-Française) who was a friend of the Gleizes family, René Arcos is invited to participate on a new journal, La Vie, in collaboration with Alexandre Mercereau, Charles Vildrac and Georges Duhamel.

In 1905 the group of writers and painters is joined by the Symbolist poet and writer Henri-Martin Barzun. Gleizes is instrumental in forming the Association Ernest Renan, launched in December at the Théâtre Pigalle, with the aim of countering the influence of militarist propaganda while providing the elements of a popular and secular culture. Gleizes is responsible for the Literary and Artistic section which organises street theatre and poetry readings.

Throughout 1906, Gleizes and his associates pursue an idea proposed by Charles Vildrac of establishing of a self-supporting artists community which would enable them to develop their art free of commercial considerations. A suitable house and grounds is found in Créteil, then a small village outside Paris. The rent for the first six months is provided by Barzun through a small inheritance. In December, Gleizes and Vildrac move in. At the outset of 1907 the Abbaye de Créteil consists of Gleizes, Arcos and Vildrac with his wife Rose, sister of Duhamel. Duhamel himself, like Barzun, appears intermittently. The group is joined by the musician Albert Doyen, later to become known as founder of the Fêtes du Peuple. Alexandre Mercereau arrives in the Spring of 1907 with a Russian wife who speaks no French. The group supports itself through the fine quality printing run by Linard and Gleizes. Occasional visitors include the painters Berthold Mahn, Jacques d'Otémar and Henri Doucet.

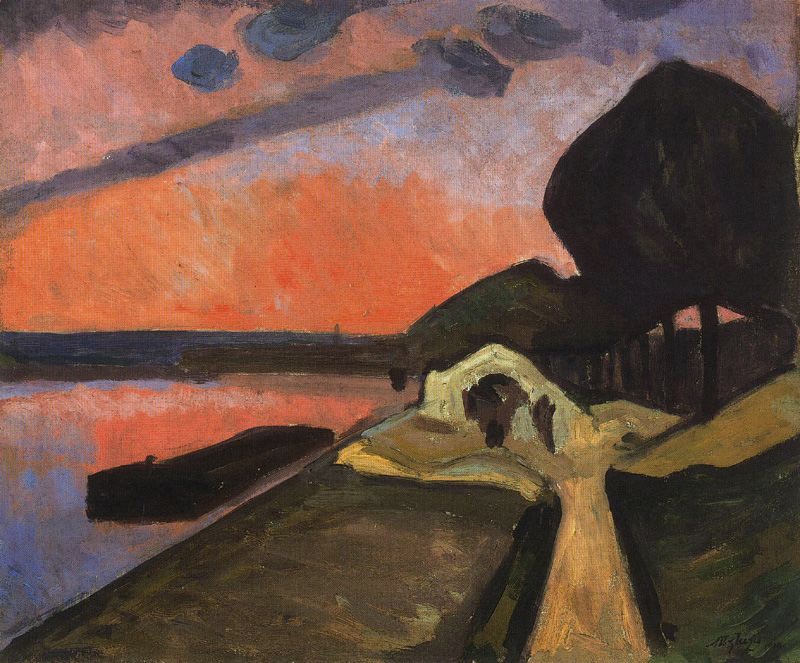
Albert Gleizes, 1909, Les Bords de la Marne (The Banks of the Marne), oil on canvas, 54 × 65 cm, Museum of Fine Arts of Lyon

The poets of the Abbaye, Arcos, Duhamel and Barzun, develop a distinctive style dealing in free verse, with epic subjects influenced by Walt Whitman, Emil Verhaeren and, especially, the French epic Symbolist poet René Ghil. Ghil developed his ideas on language, at first, in close relation with Symbolist poet Stéphane Mallarmé. Ghil held open evenings every Friday, attended by the members of the Abbaye. The Abbaye published books by a wide variety of authors including Robert de Montesqiou, model for the Duc de Charlus in Marcel Proust's À la recherche du temps perdu, the Polish anarchist and art theorist Mecislas Golberg, and the well-known collection of poems La Vie Unanime, by Jules Romains. La Vie Unanime was the result of a vision Romains had in 1903, writes Peter Brooke, "in which he had seen all the phenomena of daily life as intimately related like the different parts of a single huge beast". On the strength of its association with Romains the Abbaye de Créteil is often described as 'Unanimist'.

During the Summer of 1908 Gleizes and Mercereau organise a great Journée portes ouvertes at the Abbaye, with poetry readings, music and exhibitions. Participants included the Italian Symbolist poet, soon to be the theorist of Futurism, Filippo Tommaso Marinetti, and the Romanian sculptor Constantin Brâncuși. Gleizes' own painting in this period shifts from Post-Impressionism towards a fluid, linear style, with close relations to Symbolism and Les Nabis.

When the Abbaye closed in January 1908, Gleizes moved into a studio situated in 9th arrondissement of Paris, rue du Delta, with his friend the painter and poet Henri Doucet. Though his subject matter is always taken from an unsentimental observation of the world, writes Brooke, 'Gleizes has a marked preference for urban and semi-urban scenes with an emphasis on human labour'. Though he often uses bright colors there is little or no interest in either Fauvism or Divisionism, the two schools that now dominate the Parisian Avant-garde.

In 1909 Gleizes' evolution towards a more linear proto-Cubist style continues with greater emphasis on clear, simplified, construction; Les Bords de la Marne (The Banks of the Marne). At the Salon d'Automne Gleizes is impressed by the work of Henri Le Fauconnier, especially his portrait of the poet Pierre Jean Jouve. Le Fauconnier's portraits and his landscapes painted in Brittany (Ploumanac'h) show the intention of simplifying form similar to that of Gleizes. The two painters meet through the intermediary of Alexandre Mercereau.

Gleizes exhibits his proto-Cubist works Portrait de René Arcos and L'Arbre at the 1910 Salon des Indépendants, two paintings in which the emphasis on simplified form clearly overwhelms the representational aspect of the works. The same tendency is evident in Jean Metzinger's Portrait of Apollinaire (1909) exhibited at the same Salon. In his Anecdotiques, 16 October 1911, Apollinaire writes: "I am honoured to be the first model of a Cubist painter, Jean Metzinger, for a portrait exhibited in 1910 at the Salon des Indépendants." It was not only the first Cubist portrait, according to Apollinaire, but it was also the first great portrait of the poet exhibited in public, prior to others by Louis Marcoussis, Amedeo Modigliani, Pablo Picasso and Mikhail Larionov. Gleizes and Metzinger become seriously interested in each other's work.

==== Jean Metzinger ====
Jean Metzinger, c.1905, Baigneuses, Deux nus dans un jardin exotique (Two Nudes in an Exotic Landscape), oil on canvas, 116 × 88.8 cm, Colección Carmen Thyssen-Bornemisza

Until 1910 Picasso, Metzinger, and Braque were the only pioneers of the movement [...] and it was they who originated the term Cubism. (Maurice Raynal, 1912)

Jean Metzinger's 1905-1906 Fauvist-divisionist technique, too, had its parallel in literature. For him, there was an emblematic alliance between the Symbolist writers and Neo-Impressionism. Each brushstroke of color was equivalent to a word or 'syllable'. Together the cubes of pigments formed sentences or 'phrases', translating various emotions. This is an important aspect of Metzinger's early work, proto-Cubist work, and an important aspect of Metzinger's entire artistic output (as a painter, writer, poet, and theorist). Prior to the advent of Cubism Metzinger coupled Symbolist/Neo-Impressionist color theory with Cézannian perspective, beyond not just the preoccupations of Paul Signac and Henri-Edmond Cross, but beyond too the preoccupations of his avant-garde entourage.

"I ask of divided brushwork not the objective rendering of light, but iridescence and certain aspects of color still foreign to painting. I make a kind of chromatic versification and for syllables I use strokes which, variable in quantity, cannot differ in dimension without modifying the rhythm of a pictorial phraseology destined to translate the diverse emotions aroused by nature." (Metzinger, 1907)

Gino Severini, 1911, La danseuse obsedante (The Haunting Dancer, Ruhelose Tanzerin), oil on canvas, 73.5 × 54 cm, private collection

An interpretation of this statement was made by Robert L. Herbert: "What Metzinger meant is that each little tile of pigment has two lives: it exists as a plane where mere size and direction are fundamental to the rhythm of the painting and, secondly, it also has color which can vary independently of size and placement." (Herbert, 1968)

Gino Severini, 1910–11, La Modiste (The Milliner), oil on canvas, 64.8 × 48.3 cm, Philadelphia Museum of Art

During Metzinger's Divisionist period (see Two Nudes in an Exotic Landscape, 1905–06), each individual square of pigment associated with another of similar shape and color to form a group; each grouping of color juxtaposed with an adjacent collection of differing colors; just as syllables combine to form sentences, and sentences combine to form paragraphs, and so on. Now, the same concept formerly related to color has been adapted to form. Each individual facet associated with another adjacent shape form a group; each grouping juxtaposed with an adjacent collection of facets connect or become associated with a larger organization—just as the association of syllables combine to form sentences, and sentences combine to form paragraphs, and so on—forming what Metzinger described as the 'total image'.

=== Neo-Impressionism ===
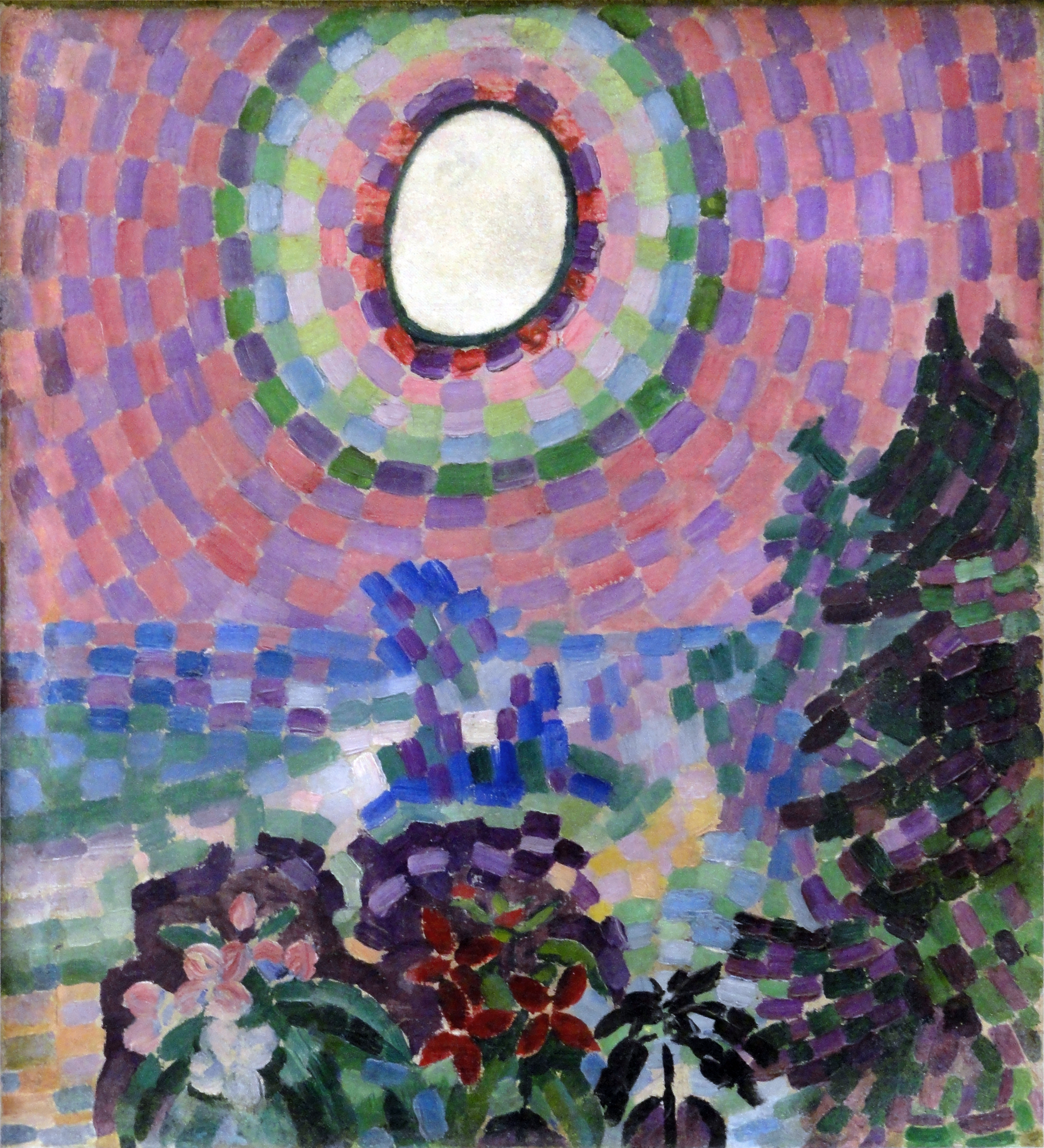
Robert Delaunay, 1906–07, Paysage au disque, oil on canvas, 55 × 46 cm, Musée national d'art moderne (MNAM), Centre Georges Pompidou, Paris

"Artists of the years 1910-1914, including Mondrian and Kandinsky as well as the Cubists", writes Robert Herbert, "took support from one of its central principles: that line and color have the ability to communicate certain emotions to the observer, independently of natural form." He continues, "Neo-Impressionist color theory had an important heir in the person of Robert Delaunay. He had been a Neo-Impressionist in the Fauve period, and knew intimately the writings of Signac and Henry. His famous solar discs of 1912 and 1913 are descended from the Neo-Impressionists' concentration upon the decomposition of spectral light."

The height of Metzinger's Neo-Impressionist work was in 1906 and 1907, when he and Delaunay painted portraits of one another in prominent rectangles of pigment. In the sky of Metzinger's Coucher de soleil no. 1, 1906–1907 (Rijksmuseum Kröller-Müller), is the solar disk which Delaunay was later (during his Cubist and Orphist phases) to make into a personal emblem.

The vibrating image of the sun in Metzinger's painting, and so too of Delaunay's Paysage au disque, "is an homage to the decomposition of spectral light that lay at the heart of Neo-Impressionist color theory...." (Herbert, 1968) (See, Jean Metzinger, Rijksmuseum Kröller-Müller, Otterlo).

Metzinger, followed closely by Delaunay—the two often painting together in 1906 and 1907—would develop a new style of Neo-Impressionism incorporating large cubic brushstrokes within highly geometrized compositions that had great significance shortly thereafter within the context of their Cubist works. Both Gino Severini and Piet Mondrian developed a similar mosaic-like Cubo-Divisionist technique between 1909 and 1911. The Futurists later (1911–1916) would incorporate the style, under the influence of Gino Severini's Parisian works, into their 'dynamic' paintings and sculpture.

"The Neo-Impressionists" according to Maurice Denis, "inaugurated a vision, a technique, and esthetic based on the recent discoveries of physics, on a scientific conception of the world and of life".

Robert Herbert writes, of the changes occurring in the early 20th century: "By about 1904, the resolution of the dilemma was made in favor of the abstract side of the equation. "Harmony means sacrifice", Cross said, and much of early Neo-Impressionism was jettisoned. Although they paid lip service to their established theory, Signac and Cross now painted in enormous strokes which could never pretend to mix in the eye, and which did not even retain nuance of tone. Raw, bold yellows, magentas, reds, blues, and greens sprang forth from their canvases, making them as free of the trammels of nature as any painting then being done in Europe."

Where the dialectic nature of Cézanne's work had been greatly influential during the highly expressionistic phase of proto-Cubism, between 1908 and 1910, the work of Seurat, with its flatter, more linear structures, would capture the attention of the Cubists from 1911.

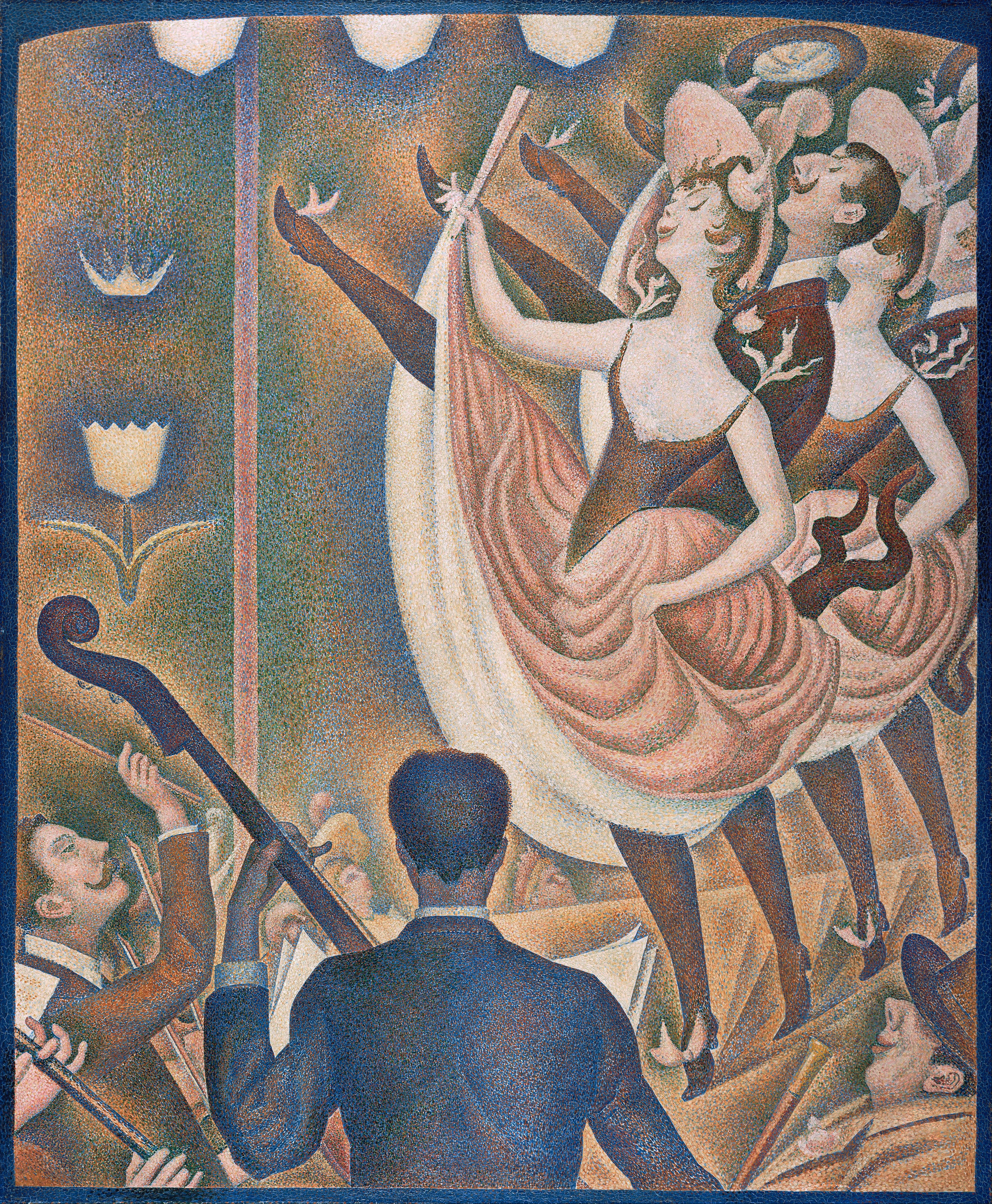
Georges Seurat, 1889–90, Le Chahut, oil on canvas, 171.5 × 140.5 cm (66 7/8 × 54 3/4 in), Kröller-Müller Museum, Otterlo, Netherlands

"With the advent of monochromatic Cubism in 1910–1911," Herbert continues, "questions of form displaced color in the artists' attention, and for these Seurat was more relevant. Thanks to several exhibitions, his paintings and drawings were easily seen in Paris, and reproductions of his major compositions circulated widely among the Cubists. The Chahut [Rijksmuseum Kröller-Müller, Otterlo] was called by André Salmon "one of the great icons of the new devotion", and both it and the Cirque (Circus), Musée d'Orsay, Paris, according to Guillaume Apollinaire, "almost belong to Synthetic Cubism".

The concept was well established among the French artists that painting could be expressed mathematically, in terms of both color and form; and this mathematical expression resulted in an independent and compelling 'objective truth,' perhaps more so than the objective truth of the object represented.

Indeed, the Neo-Impressionists had succeeded in establishing an objective scientific basis in the domain of color (Seurat addresses both problems in Circus and Dancers). Soon, the Cubists were to do so in both the domain of form and dynamics (Orphism) would do so with color too.

With the exception of Picasso (his Blue and Pink periods being entirely different intellectually), all the leading Cubists and Futurists came from Neo-Impressionism, believing its objective validity to be a scientific discovery. It was in part this scientific basis that left the avant-garde artists vulnerable to the critique of scientific objectivity, of the type developed first by Immanuel Kant, then Ernst Mach, Henri Poincaré, Hermann Minkowski and of course Albert Einstein; in relation to, for example, the treatment of time as the fourth dimension.

=== African, Egyptian, Greek, Iberian and Oceanic art ===
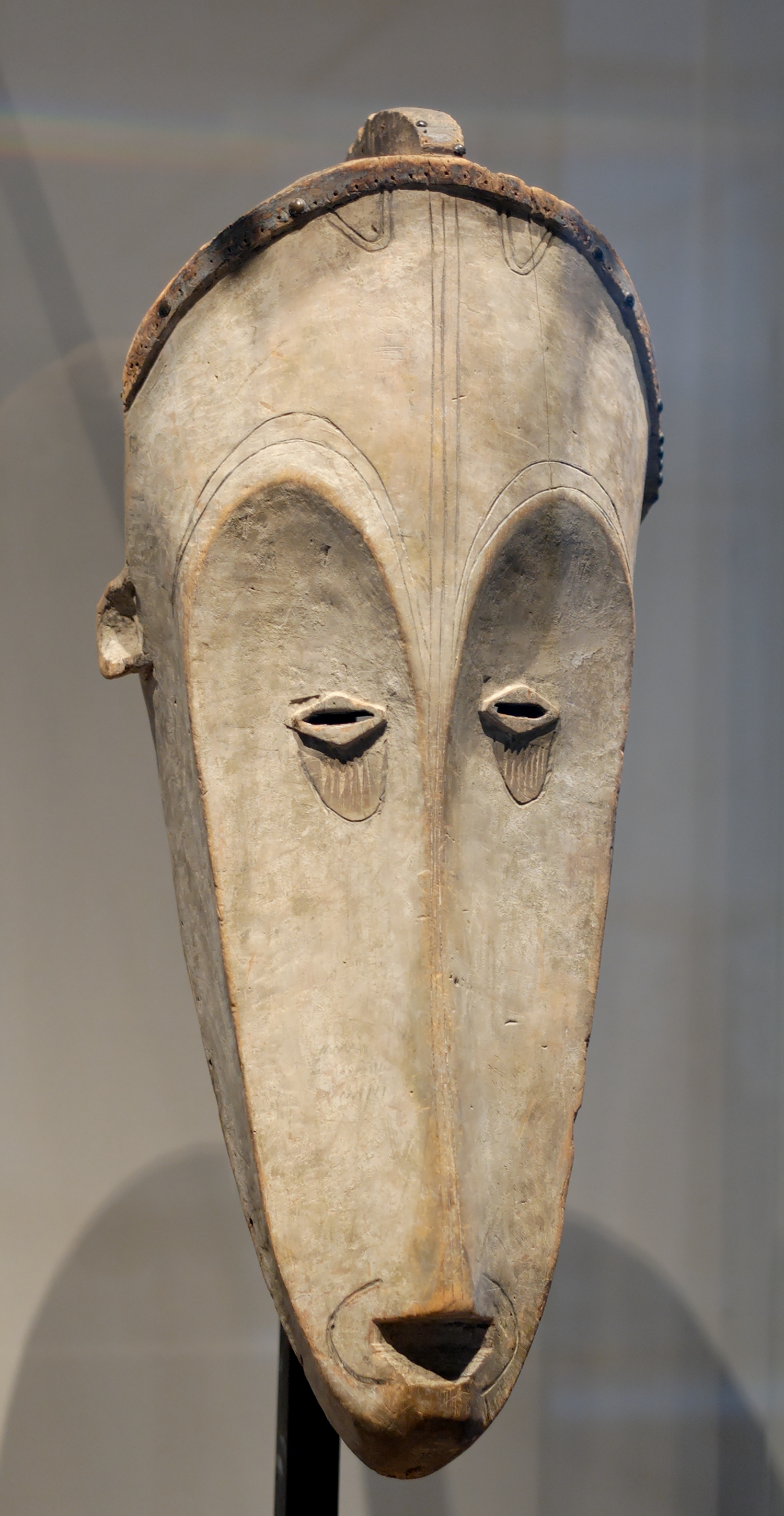
African Fang mask similar in style to those Picasso saw in Paris prior to painting Les Demoiselles d'Avignon

Another factor in the shift towards abstraction could be found burgeoning in art circles during the late 19th and early 20th centuries. Europeans were discovering Prehistoric art, along with art produced by a variety of cultures: African art, Cycladic art, Oceanic art, Art of the Americas, the Art of ancient Egypt, Iberian sculpture, and Iberian schematic art. Artists such as Paul Gauguin, Henri Matisse, André Derain, Henri Rousseau and Pablo Picasso were intrigued and inspired by the stark power and stylistic simplicity of those cultures.

Around 1906, Picasso met Matisse through Gertrude Stein, at a time when both artists had recently acquired an interest in Tribal art, Iberian sculpture and African tribal masks. They became friendly rivals and competed with each other throughout their careers, perhaps leading to Picasso entering a new period in his work by 1907, marked by the influence of ethnographic art. Picasso's paintings of 1907 have been characterized as proto-Cubism, as Les Demoiselles d'Avignon, the antecedent of Cubism.

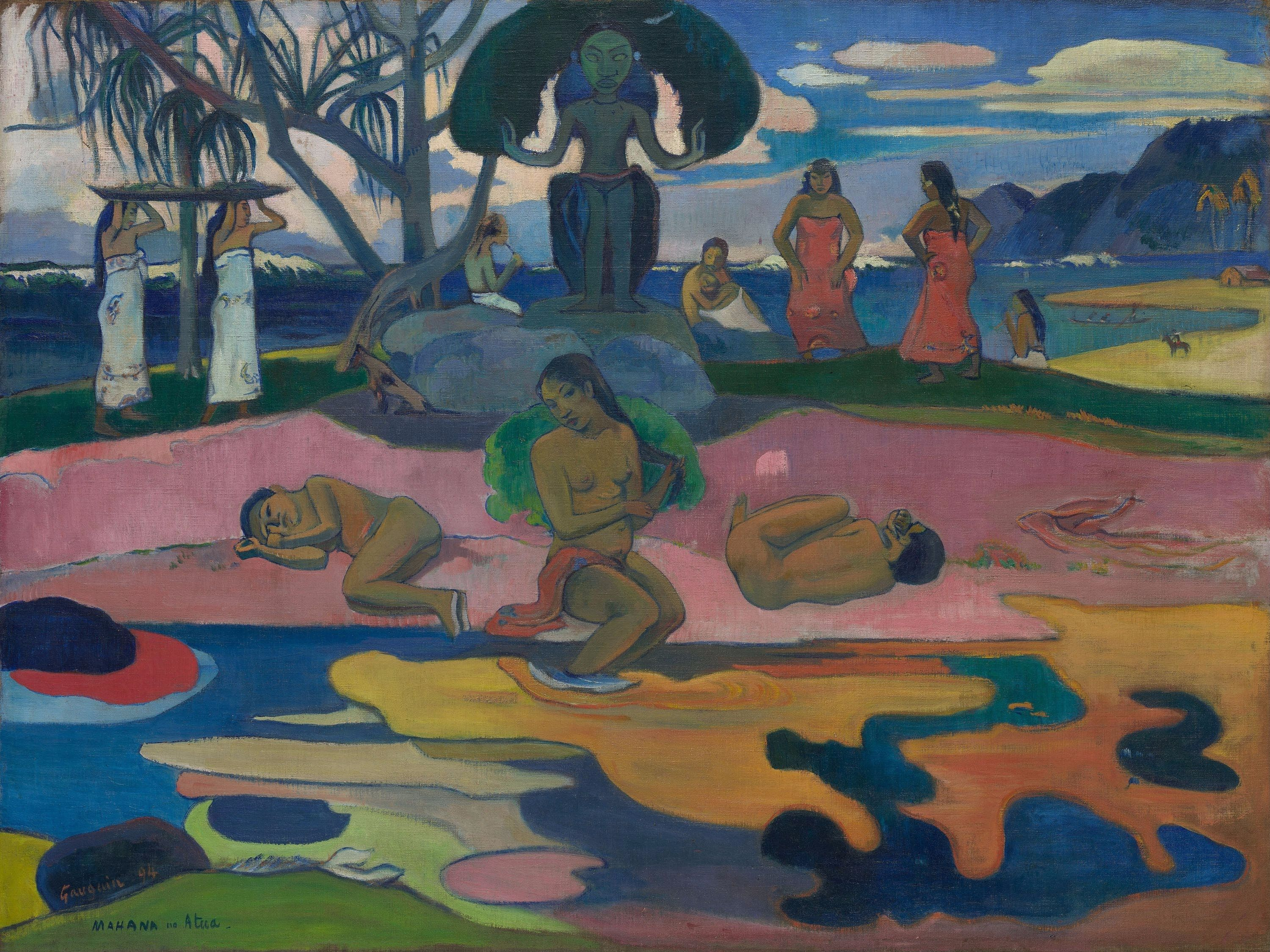
Paul Gauguin, 1894, Mahana no Atua (Day of the Gods, Jour de Dieu), oil on canvas, 66 cm × 87 cm (26 in × 34 in), Art Institute of Chicago

The African influence, which introduced anatomical simplifications and expressive features, is another generally assumed starting point for the Proto-Cubism of Picasso. He began working on studies for Les Demoiselles d'Avignon after a visit to the ethnographic museum at Palais du Trocadero. Pierre Daix, explored Picasso's Cubism from a formal position in relation to the ideas and works of Claude Lévi-Strauss on the subject of myth. Without doubt, writes Podoksik, Picasso's proto-Cubism—coming as it did not from the external appearance of events and things, but from great emotional and instinctive feelings, from the most profound layers of the psyche—clairvoyantly (as Rimbaud would have said) arrived at the suprapersonal and thereby borders on the archaic mythological consciousness."

European artists (and art collectors) prized these objects for their stylistic traits defined as attributes of primitive expression: absence of classical perspective, simple outlines and shapes, presence of symbolic signs including the hieroglyph, emotive figural distortions, and the dynamic rhythms generated by repetitive ornamental patterns. These were the profound energizing stylistic attributes, present in the visual arts of Africa, Oceana, the Americas, that attracted the Parisian avant-garde.

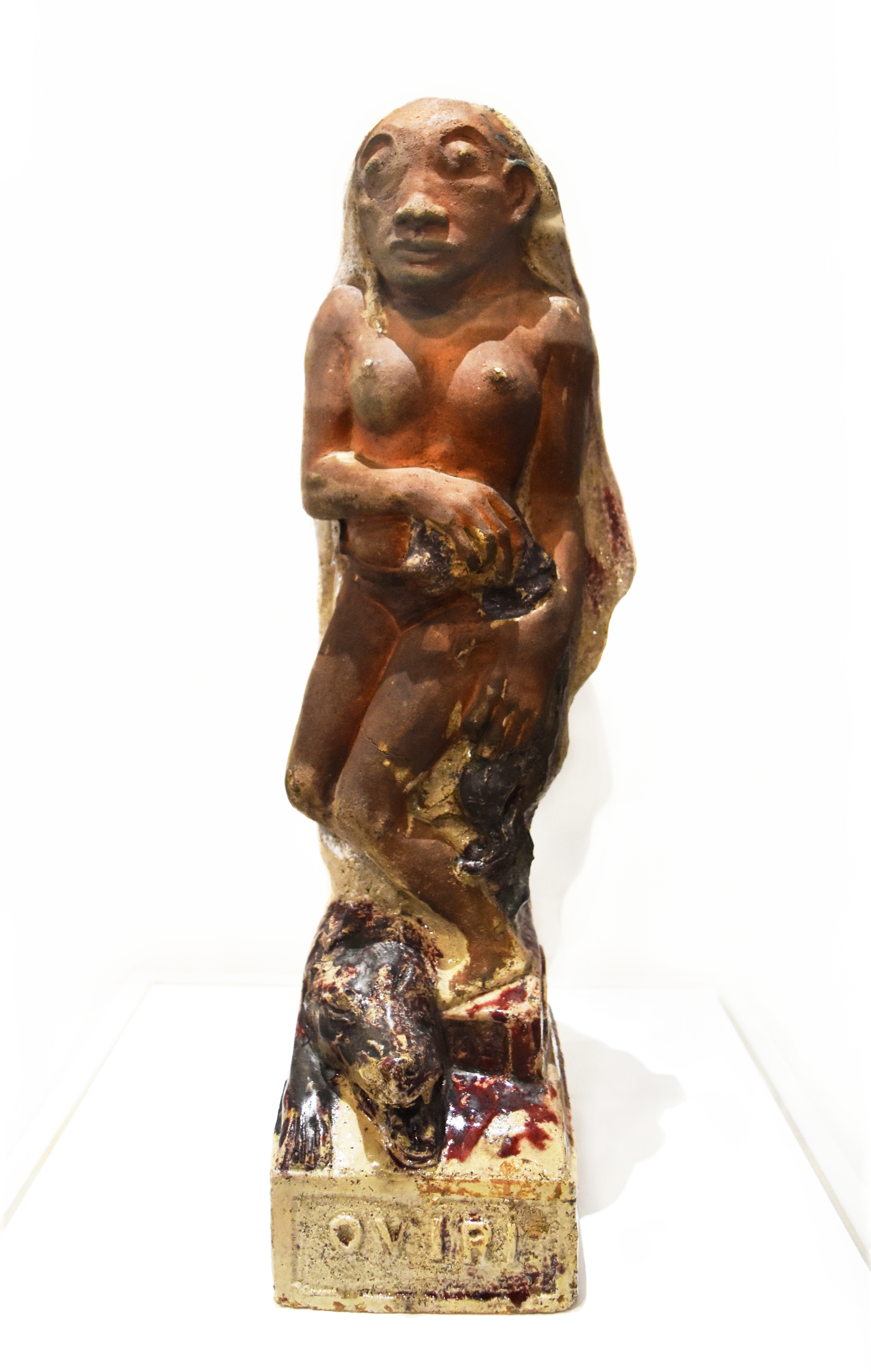
Paul Gauguin, 1894, Oviri (Sauvage), partially glazed stoneware, 75 × 19 × 27 cm, Musée d'Orsay, Paris

The works of Paul Gauguin had achieved center stage in the avant-garde circles of Paris following the powerful posthumous retrospective exhibitions at the Salon d'Automne in 1903 and 1906. Picasso's paintings of monumental figures from 1906 were directly influenced by the paintings, sculptures and writings of Gauguin. The savage power evoked by Gauguin's work lead directly to Les Demoiselles in 1907. According to Gauguin biographer David Sweetman, Picasso became an aficionado of Gauguin's work in 1902 when he befriended the expatriate Spanish sculptor and ceramist Paco Durrio in Paris. Durrio, both a friend of Gauguin's and an unpaid agent of his work, had several of Gauguin's works on hand, in an attempt to help his poverty-stricken friend in Tahiti by promoting his oeuvre in Paris.

Concerning Gauguin's impact on Picasso, art historian John Richardson wrote,

"The 1906 exhibition of Gauguin's work left Picasso more than ever in this artist's thrall. Gauguin demonstrated the most disparate types of art—not to speak of elements from metaphysics, ethnology, symbolism, the Bible, classical myths, and much else besides—could be combined into a synthesis that was of its time yet timeless. An artist could also confound conventional notions of beauty, he demonstrated, by harnessing his demons to the dark gods (not necessarily Tahitian ones) and tapping a new source of divine energy. If in later years Picasso played down his debt to Gauguin, there is no doubt that between 1905 and 1907 he felt a very close kinship with this other Paul, who prided himself on Spanish genes inherited from his Peruvian grandmother. Had not Picasso signed himself 'Paul' in Gauguin's honor."

Both David Sweetman and John Richardson point to the Gauguin's Oviri (literally meaning 'savage'), a gruesome phallic representation of the Tahitian goddess of life and death intended for Gauguin's grave. First exhibited in the 1906 Salon d'Automne retrospective, it was likely a direct influence on Les Demoiselles. Sweetman writes, "Gauguin's statue Oviri, which was prominently displayed in 1906, was to stimulate Picasso's interest in both sculpture and ceramics, while the woodcuts would reinforce his interest in print-making, though it was the element of the primitive in all of them which most conditioned the direction that Picasso's art would take. This interest would culminate in the seminal Les Demoiselles d'Avignon."

Many artists associated with Post-Impressionism, Divisionism and Fauvism transited through a proto-Cubist period, while some delved deeper into the problems of geometric abstraction, becoming known as Cubists, others chose different paths. And not all underwent the transformation by passing through the Primitivist phase.

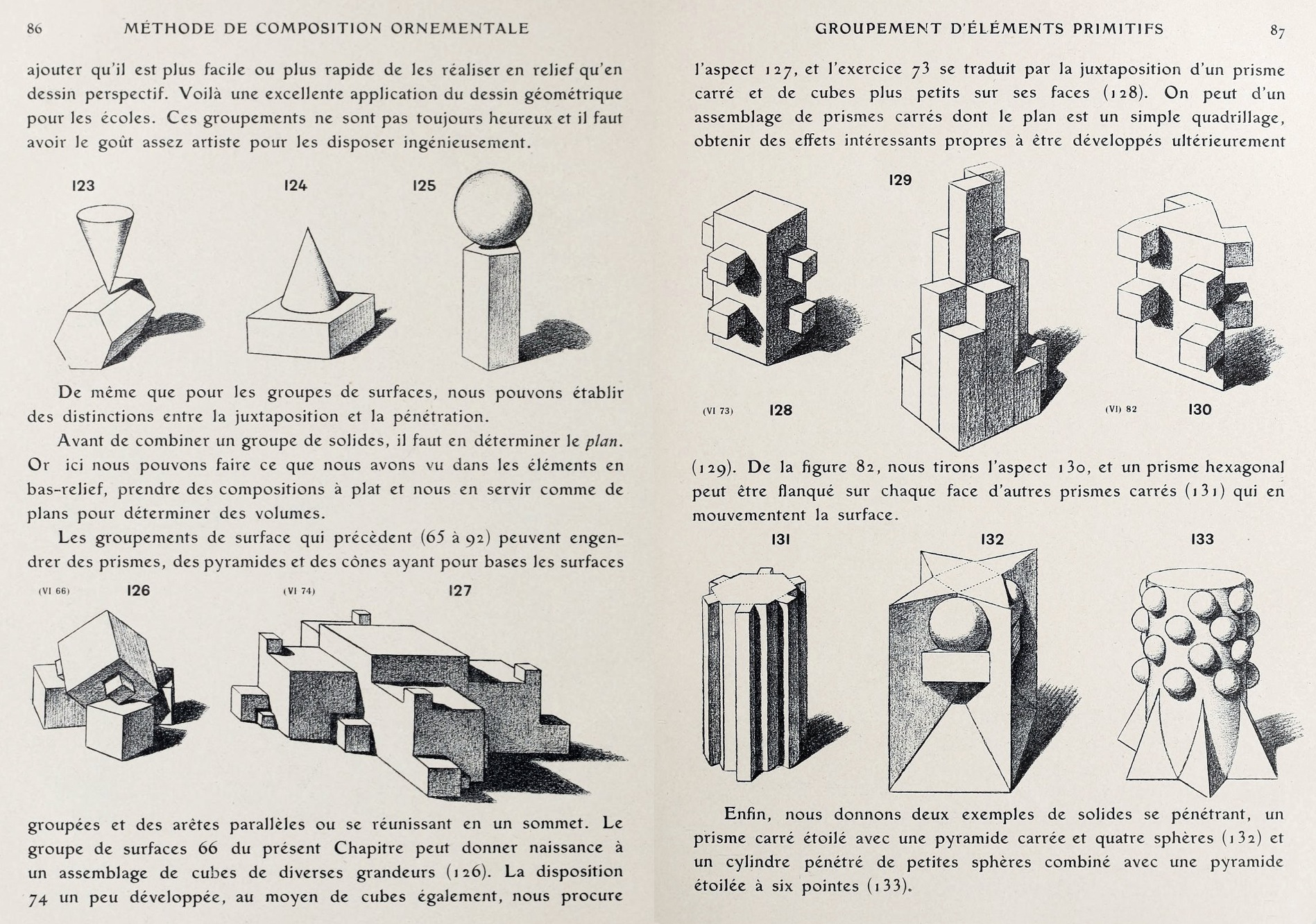
Eugène Grasset, 1905, Méthode de Composition Ornementale, Éléments Rectilignes, Groupement d'Eléments Primitifs, pp. 86, 87

=== Further influences ===
==== Grasset's cubes, cones and spheres ====
In 1905 Eugène Grasset wrote and published Méthode de Composition Ornementale, Éléments Rectilignes within which he systematically explores the decorative (ornamental) aspects of geometric elements, forms, motifs and their variations, in contrast with (and as a departure from) the undulating Art Nouveau style of Hector Guimard and others, so popular in Paris a few years earlier. Grasset stresses the principle that various simple geometric shapes (e.g., the circle, triangle, the square, along with their respective volumes, spheres, cones and cubes) are the basis of all compositional arrangements.

==== Chronophotography ====
Eadweard Muybridge, 1887, Kiss, animated from Animal locomotion, Vol. IV, Plate 444

The Chronophotography of Eadweard Muybridge and Étienne-Jules Marey had a profound influence on the beginnings of Cubism and Futurism. These photographic motion studies particularly interested artists that would later form a groups known as the Société Normande de Peinture Moderne and Section d'Or, including Jean Metzinger, Albert Gleizes and Marcel Duchamp. A predecessor to cinematography and moving film, chronophotography involved a series or succession of different images, originally created and used for the scientific study of movement. These studies would directly influence Marcel Duchamp's Nu descendant un escalier n° 2 and could also be read into Metzinger's work of 1910–12, though rather than simultaneously superimposing successive images to depict the motion, Metzinger represents the subject at rest viewed from multiple angles; the dynamic role is played by the artist rather than the subject.

Eadweard Muybridge's sequential photography of movements broken down frame by frame produced in the late 19th century depicting a wide variety of subjects in motion, were known in Europe at the beginning of the 20th century. Muybridge often traveled to Europe to promote his work, and he met Étienne-Jules Marey in 1881. His freeze-framed images evoked time and motion. Displayed in a grid, the subject is captured in split-second intervals.

In an interview with Katherine Kuh, Marcel Duchamp spoke about his work and its relation to the photographic motion studies of Muybridge and Marey:

"The idea of describing the movement of a nude coming downstairs while still retaining static visual means to do this, particularly interested me. The fact that I had seen chronophotographs of fencers in action and horse galloping (what we today call stroboscopic photography) gave me the idea for the Nude. It doesn't mean that I copied these photographs. The Futurists were also interested in somewhat the same idea, though I was never a Futurist. And of course the motion picture with its cinematic techniques was developing then too. The whole idea of movement, of speed, was in the air."

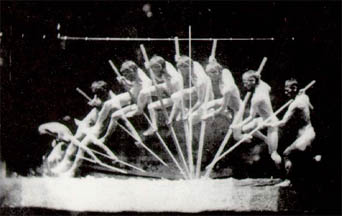
Thomas Eakins, c. 1885, Man Pole-vaulting, Study in human motion. Eakins invented a camera that could record several sequential exposures of a moving person in a single photograph

Between 1883 and 1886, Muybridge made more than 100,000 images, capturing the interest of artists at home and abroad. In 1884, the painter Thomas Eakins briefly worked alongside him, learning about the application of photography to the study of human and animal motion. Eakins later favoured the use of multiple exposures superimposed on a single photographic negative, while Muybridge used multiple cameras to produce separate images that could be projected by his zoopraxiscope. In 1887, Muybridge's photos were published as a massive portfolio comprising 781 plates and 20,000 photographs in a groundbreaking collection titled Animal Locomotion: an Electro-Photographic Investigation of Connective Phases of Animal Movements.

In his later work, Muybridge was influenced by, and in turn influenced the French photographer Étienne-Jules Marey. In 1881, Muybridge first visited Marey's studio in France and viewed stop-motion studies before returning to the US to further his own work in the same area. Marey was a pioneer in producing multiple exposure sequential images using a rotary shutter in his so-called "Marey wheel" camera.

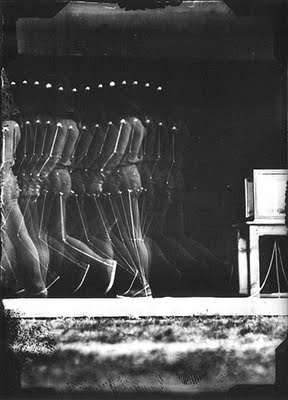
Étienne-Jules Marey, 1890–91, Homme qui marche (Man Walking), Chronophotography

While Marey's scientific achievements in photography and chronophotography are indisputable, Muybridge's efforts were to some degree more artistic than scientific.

After his work at the University of Pennsylvania, Muybridge travelled extensively, giving numerous lectures and demonstrations of his still photography and primitive motion picture sequences. At the Chicago World's Columbian Exposition of 1893, Muybridge presented a series of lectures on the "Science of Animal Locomotion" in the Zoopraxographical Hall, built specially for that purpose. He used his zoopraxiscope to show his moving pictures to a paying public, making the Hall the first commercial movie theater.

Marey also made movies. His chronophotographic gun (1882) was capable of taking 12 consecutive frames a second, and the most interesting fact is that all the frames were recorded on the same picture. Using these pictures he studied a great variety of animals. Some call it Marey's "animated zoo". Marey also studied human locomotion. He published several books including Le Mouvement in 1894.

His movies were at a high speed of 60 images per second and of image quality that was considered high quality at the time: being important in slow-motion cinematography. His research on how to capture and display moving images helped the emerging field of cinematography.

Towards the turn of the century, he returned to studying the movement of quite abstract forms, like a falling ball. His last great work, executed just before the outbreak of Fauvism in Paris, was the observation and photography of smoke trails. This research was partially funded by Samuel Pierpont Langley under the auspices of the Smithsonian Institution, after the two met in Paris at the Exposition Universelle (1900).

==== Philosophical, scientific and social motivations ====
To justify such a radical move towards the depiction of the world in unrecognizable terms, Antliff and Leighten argue that the emergence of Cubism transpired during an era of dissatisfaction with positivism, materialism and determinism. The 19th century theories upon which such philosophies were based, came under attack by intellectuals such as the philosophers Henri Bergson and Friedrich Nietzsche, William James and the mathematician Henri Poincaré. New philosophical and scientific ideas emerged based on non-Euclidean geometry, Riemannian geometry and the relativity of knowledge, contradicting notions of absolute truth. These ideas were disseminated and debated in widely available popularized publications, and read by writers and artists associated with the advent of Cubism. Popularized too were new scientific discoveries such as Röntgen's X-rays, Hertzian electromagnetic radiation and radio waves propagating through space, revealing realities not only hidden from human observation, but beyond the sphere of sensory perception. Perception was no longer associated solely with the static, passive receipt of visible signals, but became dynamically shaped by learning, memory and expectation.

Between 1881 and 1882 Poincaré wrote a series of works titled On curves defined by differential equations within which he built a new branch of mathematics called "qualitative theory of differential equations". Poincaré showed that even if the differential equation can not be solved in terms of known functions, a wealth of information about the properties and behavior of the solutions can be found (from the very form of the equation). He investigated the nature of trajectories of integral curves in a plane; classifying singular points (saddle, focus, center, node), introducing the concept of a limit cycle and the loop index. For the finite-difference equations, he created a new direction – the asymptotic analysis of the solutions. He applied all these achievements to study practical problems of mathematical physics and celestial mechanics, and the methods used were the basis of its topological works.

The singular points of the integral curves

Saddle

Focus

Center

Node

Poincaré, following Gauss, Lobachevsky, Bernhard Riemann and others, viewed geometric models as mere conventions rather than as absolutes. Euclidean geometry, upon which traditional perspective had been founded, was but one geometric configuration among others. Non-Euclidean geometry, with its hyperbolic or spherically curved space, was thus, at the very least, an equally valid alternative. This discovery in the world of mathematics overthrew 2000 years of seeming absolutes in Euclidean geometry, and threw into question conventional Renaissance perspective by suggesting the possible existence of multi-dimensional worlds and perspectives in which things might look very different.

Pictorial space could now be transformed in response to the artists own subjectivity (expressing primal impulses, irrespective of classical perspective and Beaux Arts artistic expectations). "Adherence to subjectivity in turn" write Antliff and Leighten, "signalled a radical break from past pictorial conventions in favour of a Nietzschean expression of individual will".

Poincaré postulated that the laws believed to govern matter were created solely by the minds that 'understood' them and that no theory could be considered 'true'. "The things themselves are not what science can reach..., but only the relations between things. Outside of these relations there is no knowable reality", Poincaré wrote in his 1902 Science and Hypothesis.

Maurice Princet was a French mathematician and actuary who played a role in the birth of Cubism. An associate of Pablo Picasso, Guillaume Apollinaire, Max Jacob, Jean Metzinger, Robert Delaunay, Juan Gris and later Marcel Duchamp, Princet became known as "le mathématicien du cubisme" ("the mathematician of cubism").

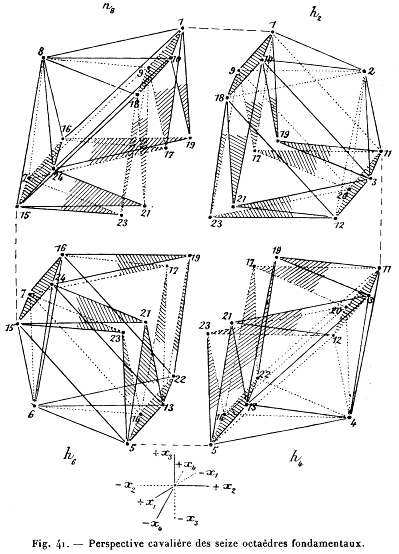
An illustration from Jouffret's Traité élémentaire de géométrie à quatre dimensions. The book, which influenced Picasso, was given to him by Princet.

Princet is credited with introducing the work of Henri Poincaré and the concept of the "fourth dimension" to artists at the Bateau-Lavoir. Princet brought to the attention of Picasso, Metzinger and others, a book by Esprit Jouffret, Traité élémentaire de géométrie à quatre dimensions (Elementary Treatise on the Geometry of Four Dimensions, 1903), a popularization of Poincaré's Science and Hypothesis in which Jouffret described hypercubes and other complex polyhedra in four dimensions and projected them onto the two-dimensional surface. Picasso's sketchbooks for Les Demoiselles d'Avignon illustrate Jouffret's influence on the artist's work.

In 1907, Princet's wife left him for André Derain, and he drifted away from the circle of artists at the Bateau-Lavoir. But Princet remained close to Metzinger and would soon participate in meetings of the Section d'Or in Puteaux. He gave informal lectures to the group, many of whom were passionate about mathematical order.

Princet's influence on the Cubists was attested to by Maurice de Vlaminck: "I witnessed the birth of cubism, its growth, its decline. Picasso was the obstetrician, Guillaume Apollinaire the midwife, Princet the godfather."

Louis Vauxcelles along similar lines dubbed Princet, sarcastically, the 'father of Cubism': "M. Princet has studied at length non-Euclidean geometry and the theorems of Riemann, of which Gleizes and Metzinger speak rather carelessly. Now then, M. Princet one day met M. Max Jacob and confided him one or two of his discoveries relating to the fourth dimension. M. Jacob informed the ingenious M. Picasso of it, and M. Picasso saw there a possibility of new ornamental schemes. M. Picasso explained his intentions to M. Apollinaire, who hastened to write them up in formularies and codify them. The thing spread and propagated. Cubism, the child of M. Princet, was born".

Metzinger, in 1910, wrote of Princet: "[Picasso] lays out a free, mobile perspective, from which that ingenious mathematician Maurice Princet has deduced a whole geometry". Later, Metzinger wrote in his memoirs:

Maurice Princet joined us often. Although quite young, thanks to his knowledge of mathematics he had an important job in an insurance company. But, beyond his profession, it was as an artist that he conceptualized mathematics, as an aesthetician that he invoked n-dimensional continuums. He loved to get the artists interested in the new views on space that had been opened up by Schlegel and some others. He succeeded at that.

==== Bergson, James, Stein ====
The nineteenth-century positivists concept of measurable deterministic time became untenable as Henri Bergson exposed his radical idea that the human experience of time was a creative process associated with biological evolution. He rejected the division of space into separate measurable units. Both Bergson and William James described the intellect as an instrumental tool, a by-product of evolution. The intellect was no longer considered a cognitive faculty able to grasp reality in an impartial manner. Instead, argued Bergson, we should rely on intuition to inspired creative insights in both the sciences and the arts. His third major work, Creative Evolution, the most widely known and most discussed of his books, appeared in 1907, constituting one of the most profound and original contributions to the philosophical consideration of evolution. The proto-Cubists would have known of his work through, amongst others, Gertrude Stein a student of William James. Stein had recently purchased, following the 1905 Salon d'Automne, Matisse's Woman with a Hat (La femme au chapeau) and Picasso's Young Girl with Basket of Flowers. With James's supervision, Stein and fellow student, Leon Mendez Solomons, performed experiments on normal motor automatism, a phenomenon hypothesized to occur in people when their attention is divided between two simultaneous intelligent activities such as writing and speaking, yielding examples of writing that appeared to represent "stream of consciousness".

Pablo Picasso, Portrait of Gertrude Stein, 1906, Metropolitan Museum of Art, New York. When someone commented that Stein didn't look like her portrait, Picasso replied, "She will". Stein wrote "If I Told Him: A Completed Portrait of Picasso" in response to the painting.

By early 1906, Leo and Gertrude Stein owned paintings by Henri Manguin, Pierre Bonnard, Pablo Picasso, Paul Cézanne, Pierre-Auguste Renoir, Honoré Daumier, Henri Matisse and Henri de Toulouse-Lautrec. Among Stein's acquaintances who frequented the Saturday evenings at her Parisian apartment were: Pablo Picasso, Fernande Olivier (Picasso's mistress), Georges Braque, André Derain, Max Jacob, Guillaume Apollinaire, Marie Laurencin (Apollinaire's mistress), Henri Rousseau, Joseph Stella and Jean Metzinger.

Disposed to accept the unorthodox in life and art, and naturally tolerant of eccentricity, Gertrude Stein had accommodated the tendency of her Parisian contemporaries of spend their time and talent looking for ways to Épater la bourgeoisie. According to the American poet and literary critic John Malcolm Brinnin, this was "a society committed to the systematic outraging of every rule". Picasso's famous dinner party for Le Douanier Rousseau was an eye-opening event in the proto-Cubist period. Le Banquet Rousseau, "one of the most notable social events of the twentieth century", writes Brinnin, "was neither an orgiastic occasion nor even an opulent one. Its subsequent fame grew from the fact that it was a colorful happening within a revolutionary art movement at a point of that movement's earliest success, and from the fact that it was attended by individuals whose separate influences radiated like spokes of creative light across the art world for generations."

Maurice Raynal, in Les Soirées de Paris, 15 January 1914, p. 69, wrote about "Le Banquet Rousseau". Years later the French writer André Salmon recalled the setting of the illustrious banquet; Picasso's studio at Le Bateau-Lavoir:

"Here the nights of the Blue Period passed... here the days of the Rose Period flowered... here the Demoiselles d'Avignon halted in their dance to re-group themselves in accordance with the golden number and the secret of the fourth dimension... here fraternized the poets elevated by serious criticism into the School of the Rue Ravignan... here in these shadowy corridors lived the true worshippers of fire ... here one evening in the year 1908 unrolled the pageantry of the first and last banquet offered by his admirers to the painter Henri Rousseau called the Douanier."

Guests at the banquet Rousseau of 1908, in addition to Picasso and the guest of honor, included Jean Metzinger, Juan Gris, Max Jacob, Marie Laurencin, Guillaume Apollinaire, André Salmon, Maurice Raynal, Daniel-Henri Kahnweiler, Leo Stein and Gertrude Stein.

No observer, either academic or independent, could have mistaken the direction of change taken by the avant-garde between 1906 and 1910. The fundamental shift away from nature within artistic circles had advanced to the status of revolt, in far-reaching ways, diverging significantly from the developments of Cézanne or Seurat. The symptoms of that shift during the first decade of the 20th century are countless and redoubtable, bursting practically overnight, and were soon to be perceived by the reactionary adversaries as no more than grotesque, incomprehensible, to be considered with haughty amusement.

== The Wild Men of Paris ==
Leading up to 1910, one year before the scandalous group exhibiting that brought "Cubism" to the attention of the general public for the first time, the draftsman, illustrator and poet, Gelett Burgess, interviewed and wrote about artists and artworks in and around Paris. After his visit to the 1910 Salon des Indépendants, the well-established anti-establishment art exhibition at this time peppered with proto-Cubist works, he wrote in humorist fashion:

There were no limits to the audacity and the ugliness of the canvasses. Still-life sketches of round, round apples and yellow, yellow oranges, on square, square tables, seen in impossible perspective; landscapes of squirming trees, with blobs of virgin color gone wrong, fierce greens and coruscating yellows, violent purples, sickening reds and shuddering blues.

But the nudes! They looked like flayed Martians, like pathological charts—hideous old women, patched with gruesome hues, lopsided, with arms like the arms of a Swastika, sprawling on vivid backgrounds, or frozen stiffly upright, glaring through misshapen eyes, with noses or fingers missing. They defied anatomy, physiology, almost geometry itself!

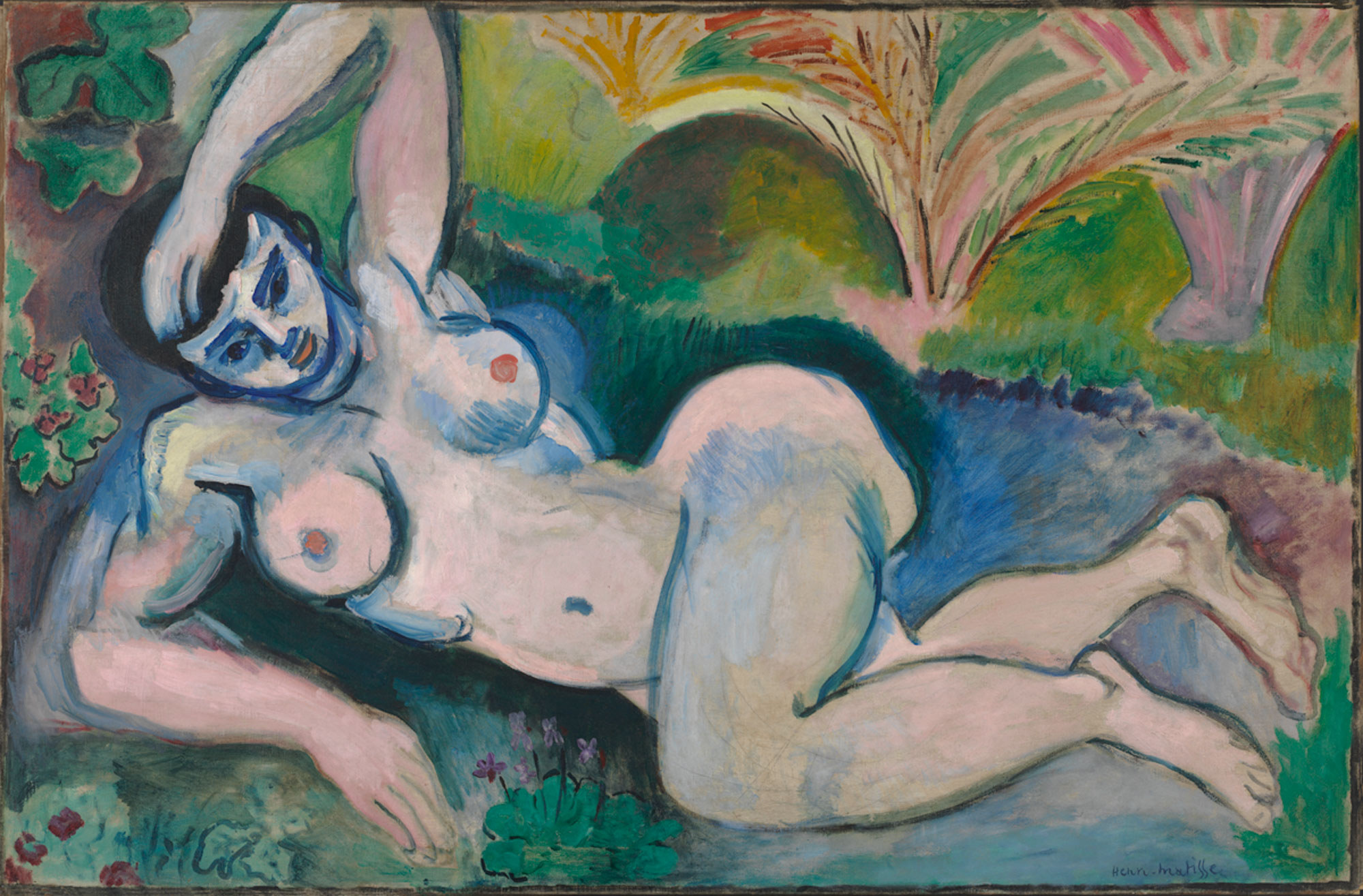
Henri Matisse, 1907, Blue Nude (Souvenir de Biskra), oil on canvas. 92 × 140 cm, Baltimore Museum of Art

Matisse's Blue Nude (Souvenir de Biskra) appeared at the 1907 Indépendants, entitled Tableau no. III. Vauxcelles writes on the topic of Nu bleu:

I admit to not understanding. An ugly nude woman is stretched out upon grass of an opaque blue under the palm trees... This is an artistic effect tending toward the abstract that escapes me completely. (Vauxcelles, Gil Blas, 20 March 1907)

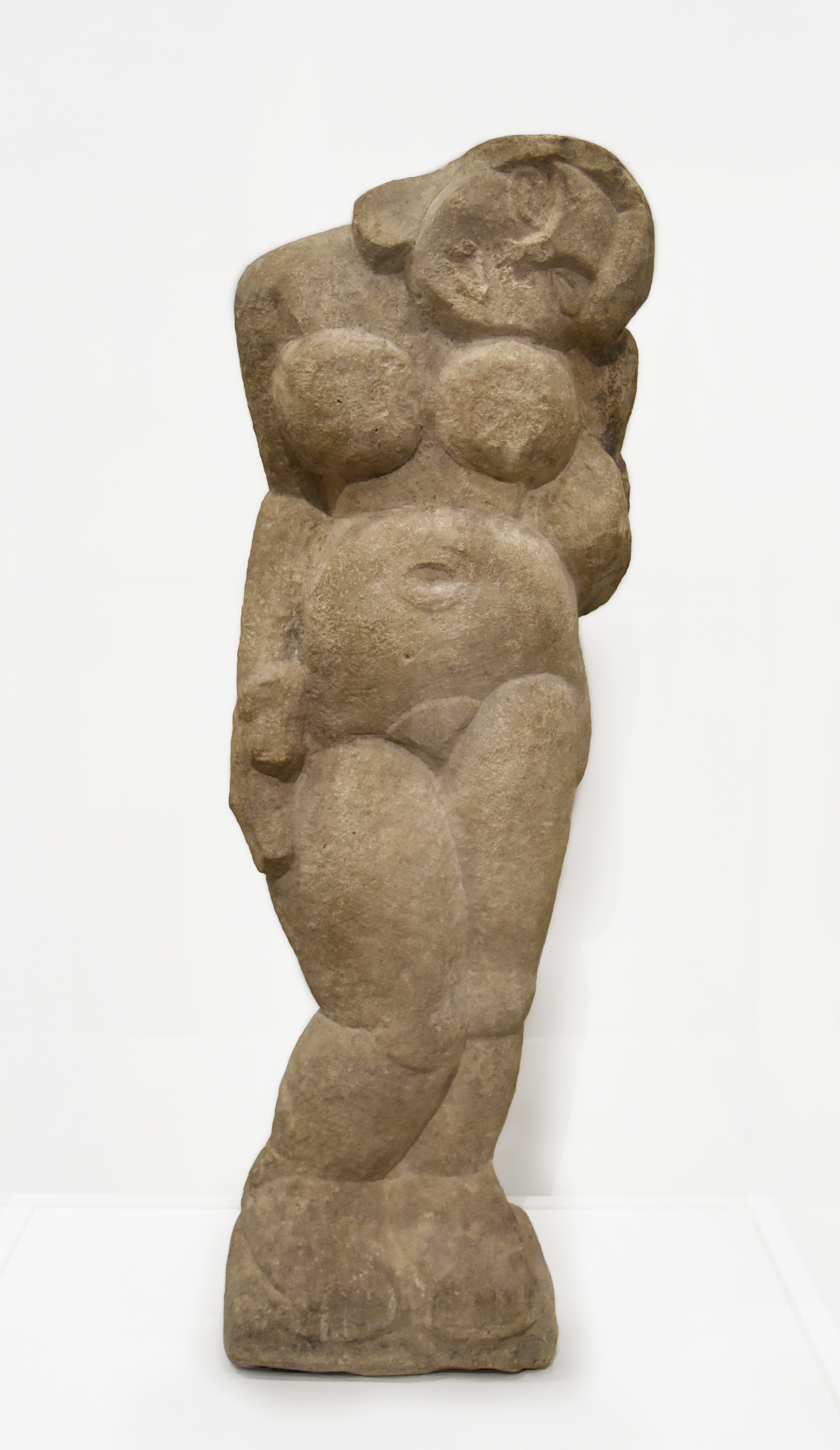
André Derain, 1907 (Automne), Nu debout, limestone, 95 × 33 × 17 cm, Musée National d'Art Moderne

Blue Nude would later create a sensation at the Armory Show of 1913 in New York City. The painting, already a certain distance from Fauvism, was deemed so ugly students burned it in effigy at the 1913 Armory Show in Chicago, where it had toured from New York.

In addition to the works of Matisse, Derain and Braque, the Indépendants of 1907 included six works (each) by Vlaminck, Dufy, Metzinger, Delaunay, Camoin, Herbin, Puy, Valtat, and three by Marquet.

Vaucelles described this group of 'Fauves':

A movement I consider dangerous (despite the great sympathy I have for its perpetrators) is taking shape among a small clan of youngsters. A chapel has been established, two haughty priests officiating. MM Derain and Matisse; a few dozen innocent catechumens have received their baptism. Their dogma amounts to a wavering schematicism that proscribes modeling and volumes in the name of I-don't-know-what pictorial abstraction. This new religion hardly appeals to me. I don't believe in this Renaissance... M. Matisse, fauve-in-chief; M. Derain, fauve deputy; MM. Othon Friesz and Dufy, fauves in attendance... and M. Delaunay (a fourteen-year-old-pupil of M. Metzinger...), infantile fauvelet. (Vauxcelles, Gil Blas, 20 March 1907).

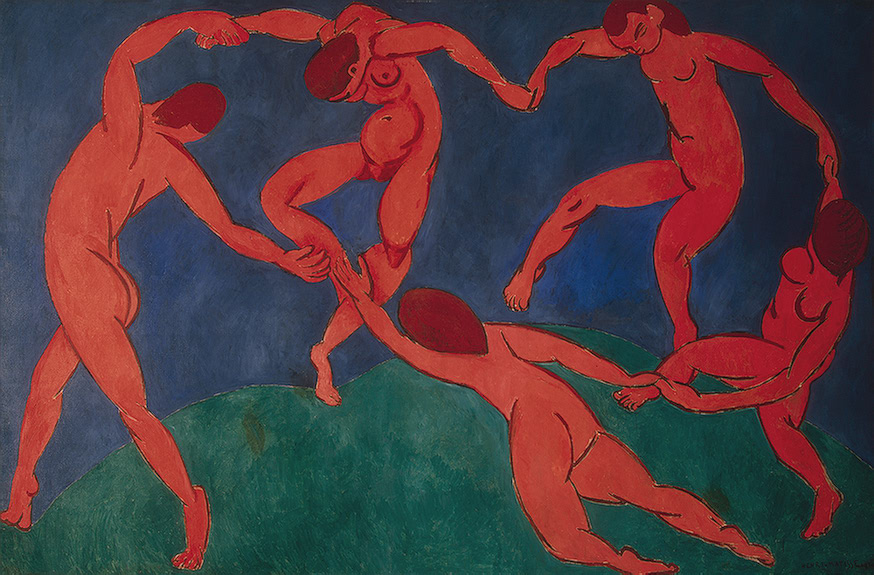
Henri Matisse, 1909–10, The Dance (second version), oil on canvas, 260 × 391 cm, Hermitage Museum, St. Petersburg, Russia. The dance theme passed through several stages in Matisse's work prior to this canvas. Only here, however, did it acquire its famous passion and expressive resonance. The frenzy of the pagan bacchanalia is embodied in the powerful, stunning accord of red, blue and green, uniting Man, Heaven and Earth.

The Fauvism of Matisse and Derain was virtually over by the spring of the 1907 Indépendants. And by the Salon d'Automne of 1907 it had ended for many others as well. The shift from bright pure colors loosely applied to the canvas gave way to a more calculated geometric approach. The priority of simplified form began to overtake the representational aspect of the works. The simplification of representational form gave way to a new complexity; the subject matter of the paintings progressively became dominated by a network of interconnected geometric planes, the distinction between foreground and background no longer sharply delineated, and the depth of field limited.

Many of Cézanne's paintings had been exhibited at the Salon d'Automne of 1904, 1905 and 1906. After Cézanne died in 1906, his paintings were exhibited in Paris in the form of a retrospective at the Salon d'Automne of 1907, greatly attracting interest and affecting the direction taken by the avant-garde artists in Paris prior to the advent of Cubism. Cézanne's explorations of geometric simplification and optical phenomena inspired not just Matisse, Derain, Braque and Metzinger, but the other artists who exhibited earlier with the Fauves. Those who had not transited through a Fauve stage, such as Picasso, experimented, too, with the complex fracturing of form. Cézanne had thus sparked a wholesale transformation in the area of artistic investigation that would profoundly affect the development modern art of the 20th century.

Pablo Picasso, 1908, Dryad, oil on canvas, 185 × 108 cm, The State Hermitage Museum, St Petersburg

Gelett Burgess writes in The Wild Men of Paris:

"Though the school was new to me, it was already an old story in Paris. It had been a nine-days’ wonder. Violent discussions had raged over it; it had taken its place as a revolt and held it, despite the fulmination of critics and the contempt of academicians. The school was increasing in numbers, in importance. By many it was taken seriously. At first, the beginners had been called "The Invertebrates". In the Salon of 1905 they were named "The Incoherents". But by 1906, when they grew more perfervid, more audacious, more crazed with theories, they received their present appellation of "Les Fauves"—the Wild Beasts. And so, and so, a-hunting I would go!"

"It was Matisse who took the first step into the undiscovered land of the ugly. Matisse himself, serious, plaintive, a conscientious experimenter, whose works are but studies in expression, who is concerned at present with but the working out of the theory of simplicity, denies all responsibility for the excesses of his unwelcome disciples."

"Picasso, keen as a whip, spirited as a devil, mad as a hatter, runs to his studio and contrives a huge nude woman composed entirely of triangles, and presents it in triumph. What wonder Matisse shakes his head and does not smile! He chats thoughtfully of the "Harmony and volume" and "architectural values", and wild Braque climbs to his attic and builds an architectural monster which he names Woman, with balanced masses and parts, with openings and columnar legs and cornices. Matisse praises the direct appeal to instinct of the African wood images, and even a sober Dérain, a co-experimenter, loses his head, moulds a neolithic man into a solid cube, creates a woman of spheres, stretches a cat out into a cylinder, and paints it red and yellow!"

Burgess, turning his attention to Metzinger, writes:

"Metzinger once did gorgeous mosaics of pure pigment, each little square of color not quite touching the next, so that an effect of vibrant light should result. He painted exquisite compositions of cloud and cliff and sea; he painted women and made them fair, even as the women upon the boulevards fair. But now, translated into the idiom of subjective beauty, into this strange Neo-Classic language, those same women, redrawn, appear in stiff, crude, nervous lines in patches of fierce color."

According to Metzinger, in his Cubism was Born, published years later, Cubism had been born out of the "need not for an intellectual art but for an art that would be something other than a systematic absurdity"; the idiocies of reproducing or copying nature in trompe-l'œil on a surface that is rigorously flat. With this type of illusion other artist of his generation such as Gleizes and Picasso wanted nothing to do. "Quite clearly" Metzinger notes, "nature and the painting make up two different worlds which have nothing in common..." Already, in 1906, "it could be said that a good portrait led one to think about the painter not the model". Metzinger continues:

Jean Metzinger, c. 1908, Baigneuses (Bathers). Dimensions and location unknown. Illustrated in Gelett Burgess, The Wild Men of Paris, The Architectural Record, Document 3, May 1910, New York

As for Picasso... the tradition he came from had prepared him better than ours for a problem to do with structure. And Berthe Weil was right when she treated those who compared him/confused him with, a Steinlen or a Lautrec as idiots. He had already rejected them in their own century, a century we had no intention of prolonging. Whether or not the Universe was endowed with another dimension, art was going to move into a different field.

The illusion had been maintained up to 1906 or 1907 through the negligence of those whose job it was to clear away the rubbish, but the break was achieved in 1908. No-one would again dare to look at a Puvis de Chavannes or read Balzac. No-one, I mean, among those who walked above the Moulin Rouge, which they would never even have thought of entering.

For Metzinger, the "entirely intuitive dissociation" between color of the Fauves and form of classical painting, exemplified in the works of Raoul Dufy (who paints first, then draws), "foreshadowed, more perhaps than Cézanne or black African art, not just Cubism but all the painting that followed afterward".

I had measured the difference that separated art prior to 1900 from the art which I felt was being born. I knew that all instruction was at an end. The age of personal expression had finally begun. The value of an artist was no longer to be judged by the finish of his execution, or by the analogies his work suggested with such-and-such an archetype. It would be judged – exclusively – by what distinguished this artist from all the others. The age of the master and pupil was finally over; I could see about me only a handful of creators and whole colonies of monkeys. (Jean Metzinger, Cubism was Born)

From his Montmartre studio on the rue Lamarck to Picasso's Bateau Lavoir studio on the rue Ravignan, writes Metzinger, "the attempt [prétention] to imitate an orb on a vertical plane, or to indicate by a horizontal straight line the circular hole of a vase placed at the height of the eyes was considered as the artifice of an illusionistic trickery that belonged to another age."

I wanted an art that was faithful to itself and would have nothing to do with the business of creating illusions. I dreamed of painting glasses from which no-one would ever think of drinking, beaches that would be quite unsuitable for bathing, nudes who would be definitively chaste. I wanted an art which in the first place would appear as a representation of the impossible. (Jean Metzinger)

== The term Cube ==
Jean Metzinger, 1906, La danse (Bacchante), oil on canvas, 73 × 54 cm. Former collection Wilhelm Uhde

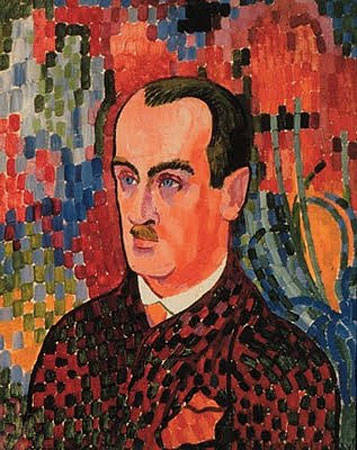
Robert Delaunay, 1907, Portrait of Wilhelm Uhde. Robert Delaunay and Sonia Terk met through the German collector/dealer Wilhelm Uhde, with whom Sonia had been married as she said for "convenience"

Both Robert Delaunay and Jean Metzinger between 1905 and 1907 painted in a Divisionist style with large squares or rectangular planes of color (see Metzinger's Two Nudes in an Exotic Landscape and La danse, Bacchante). The size and direction of each plane are fundamental to the rhythm of the painting, yet color can vary independently of size and placement. This form of Divisionism was a significant step beyond the preoccupations of Paul Signac and Henri-Edmond Cross. Writing in 1906, the art critic Louis Chassevent recognized the difference and, as Daniel Robbins pointed out in his Gleizes Guggenheim catalogue, used the word "cube" which would later be taken up by Louis Vauxcelles to baptize Cubism. Chassevent writes:

"M. Metzinger is a mosaicist like M. Signac but he brings more precision to the cutting of his cubes of color which appear to have been made mechanically [...]".

Georges Braque, 1908, Le Viaduc de L'Estaque (Viaduct at L'Estaque), oil on canvas, 73 × 60 cm, Tel Aviv Museum of Art

The history of the word "cube" goes back at least to May 1901 when Jean Béral, reviewing Cross's Neo-Impressionist work at the Indépendants in Art et Littérature commented that he "uses a large and square pointillism, giving the impression of mosaic. One even wonders why the artist has not used cubes of solid matter diversely colored: they would make pretty revetments."

During the month of March, 1905, Louis Vauxcelles, in his review of the Salon des Indépendants, published on the front page of Gil Blas, writes: "M. Metzinger, still very young, mimics his elders with the candor of a child throwing handfuls of multicolored confetti; his « point », very big, gives his paintings the appearance of a mosaic".

In 1906 Metzinger formed a close friendship with Robert Delaunay, with whom he would share an exhibition at Berthe Weill's gallery early in 1907. The two of them were singled out by Louis Vauxcelles in 1907 as Divisionists who used large, mosaic-like 'cubes' to construct small but highly symbolic compositions.

In an anonymous review of the 1908 Salon des Indépendants published in Le Matin, Metzinger is accused of making "a salad of Maurice Denis and Egyptian bas-reliefs".

In 1908, Vauxcelles again, in his review of Georges Braque's exhibition at Kahnweiler's gallery called Braque a daring man who despises form, "reducing everything, places and a figures and houses, to geometric schemas, to cubes".

Vauxcelles recounts how Matisse told him at the time, "Braque has just sent in [to the 1908 Salon d'Automne] a painting made of little cubes". The critic Charles Morice relayed Matisse's words and spoke of Braque's little cubes. The motif of the viaduct at l'Estaque had inspired Braque to produce three paintings marked by the simplification of form and deconstruction of perspective.

On 25 March 1909, Vauxcelles qualifies the works of Braque exhibited at the Salon des Indépendants as "bizarreries cubiques" (cubic oddities).

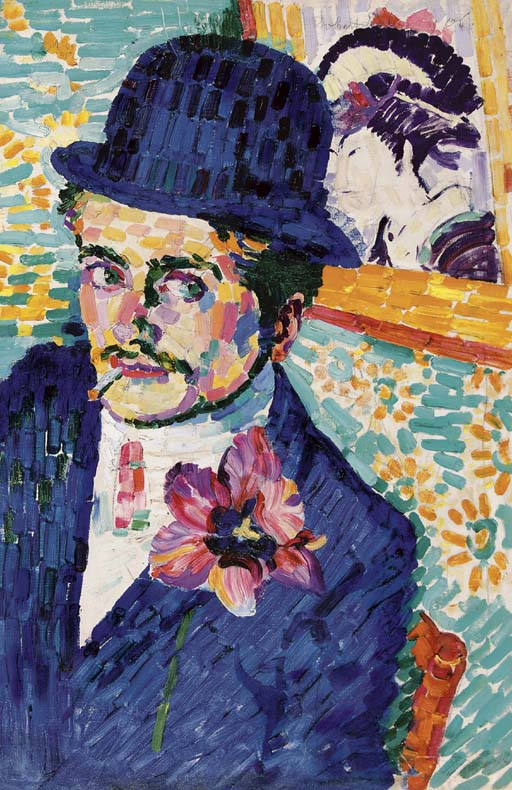
Robert Delaunay, 1906, L'homme à la tulipe (Portrait de M. Jean Metzinger), oil on canvas, 72.4 × 48.5 cm (28 1/2 by 19 1/8 in). Exhibited in Paris at the 1906 Salon d'Automne (no. 420) along with a portrait of Delaunay by Metzinger (no. 1191)

Louis Vauxcelles, this time in his review of the 26th Salon des Indépendants (1910), made a passing and imprecise reference to Metzinger, Gleizes, Delaunay, Léger and Le Fauconnier, as "ignorant geometers, reducing the human body, the site, to pallid cubes."

In his review of the 26th Salon des Indépendants, published 19 March 1910 in Le Petit Parisien, art critic Jean Claude pejoratively combined the terms "Metzinger-le-cubique".

Picasso's works are exhibited at a small gallery run by the German collector-dealer Wilhelm Uhde in May 1910 (cited in Fry 58 and Robbins 1985, pp. 12, 22). The exhibition is reviewed by Léon Werth, who used the adjective 'cubic' to describe Picasso's treatment of roofs and chimneys.

In a review of the 1910 Salon d'Automne published in L'Ouest-Éclair, a journalist (J.B.) employs the term 'Cubism' demeaningly (several months prior to the popularization of the term):

Now a note on the grotesque: Among all these "fauves"—the name given to the Impressionists in conventional workshops—the most "fauve" of all is certainly Jean Metzinger, the defender of Cubism. Cubism is a style of painting inspired by puzzles or these popular guessing-game designs for children found in certain newspapers, which consist of finding, for example, a hare pursued by a hunter in the landscape accessories. That's how "Cubism" proceeds. Under the title of Nu [Nude], Jean Metzinger shows us "cubes" of various tones, but of the same color. The trick is to find the head, the arms at different points on the canvas. It's a distraction like any other, but it is not art. This is the latest cry of pictorial craziness [loufoquerie picturale].

In another review of the 1910 Salon d'Automne, published in La Presse, art critique Edmond Epardaud writes of the 'geometric follies' of Metzinger, and describes both Gleizes and Le Fauconnier as 'specious architects' (architectes fallacieux).

The critic Jean Claude writes in his review of the same salon, with reference to Metzinger's Nu à la cheminée, published in Le Petit Parisien, "Metzinger painted a puzzle, cubic and triangular, which after verification, is a naked woman. I managed to discover the head, torso and legs. I had to give up finding arms. This is beyond comprehension".

Although Cézanne was "the point of departure for these mad explorers," Gelett Burgess writes, "It was Matisse who took the first step into the undiscovered land of the ugly." Picasso, at the time, painted a nude woman "composed entirely of triangles". Braque "builds an architectural monster which he names woman". Braque was, according to Burgess, "the originator of architectural nudes with square feet, as square as boxes, with right-angled shoulders". Derain, "a co-experimenter," writes Burgess, "moulds a neolithic man into a solid cube, creates a woman of spheres, stretches a cat out into a cylinder, and paints it red and yellow!"

In his 1912 Anecdotal History of Cubism André Salmon writes:

Jean Metzinger and Robert Delaunay painted landscapes planted with cottages reduced to the severe appearance of parallelepipeds. Living less of an interior life than Picasso, remaining to all outward appearances more like painters than their precursor, these young artists were in a much greater hurry for results, though they be less complete. [...]

Exhibited, their works passed almost unobserved by the public and by art critics, who...recognized only the Fauves, whether it be to praise or to curse to them.

Now, the king of the Fauves... Henri Matisse... with one word cast out Jean Metzinger and Robert Delaunay from the family. With that feminine sense of the appropriate, the basis of his taste, he baptized the cottages of the two painters, "Cubist". An ingenuous or ingenious art critic was with him. He ran to his newspaper and with style wrote the gospel article; the next day the public learned of the birth of Cubism. (André Salmon, 1912)

The word "cube" for Chassevent in 1906, with regard to the large, thickly painted, and highly geometrized paintings of Metzinger and Delaunay, did not imply a movement. Nor did the word "cube" for Vauxcelles hold any special meaning two and a half years later when he wrote (in November 1908) a brief passage about Braque's landscapes exhibited at the Kahnweiler gallery: "He scorns forms, reduces all sites and figures and houses, to geometric schemas, to cubes":

"In neither case" notes Daniel Robbins, "did the use of the word "cube" lead to the immediate identification of the artists with a new pictorial attitude, with a movement. The word was no more than an isolated descriptive epithet that, in both cases, was prompted by a visible passion for structure so assertive that the critics were wrenched, momentarily, from their habitual concentration on motifs and subjects, in which context their comments on drawing, color, tonality, and, only occasionally, conception, resided." (Robbins, 1985)

In light of the headway made by Cézanne, the multiple use of the word "cube" with reference to diverse works by diverse artists, and the other factors involved (political, social, cultural), it has been suggested that Cubism, with its proto-phase, would have emerged regardless of Picasso's intervention. The art historian and collector Douglas Cooper viewed Cubist painting to have been the beginning of a stylistic revolution which was inevitable. The American art scholar and MoMA curator William Rubin argued that Braque, with his commitment to a Cézannist syntax, would have created early Cubism had Picasso never existed.

== Three dimensions on a flat surface ==
Pablo Picasso, 1907, Les Demoiselles d'Avignon, oil on canvas, 243.9 cm × 233.7 cm (8.00 ft × 7.67 ft) 8"), Museum of Modern Art, New York. Picasso later called this his "first exorcism painting". A specific danger he had in mind was life-threatening sexual disease, a source of considerable anxiety in Paris at the time; earlier studies more closely link sexual pleasure to mortality.

Pablo Picasso's 1907 painting Les Demoiselles d'Avignon has often been considered a proto-Cubist work. Georges Braque's 1908 Houses at L’Estaque (and related works) prompted the critic Louis Vauxcelles to refer to bizarreries cubiques (cubic oddities). Gertrude Stein referred to landscapes made by Picasso in 1909, such as Reservoir at Horta de Ebro or Brick factory at Tortosa, as the first Cubist paintings.

According to the personal predilections of Kahnweiler, Picasso's Les Demoiselles d'Avignon was the beginning of Cubism, and yet he writes:

Early in 1907 Picasso began a strange large painting depicting women, fruit and drapery, which he left unfinished. It cannot be called other than unfinished, even though it represents a long period of work. Begun in the spirit of the works of 1906, it contains in one section the endeavors of 1907 and thus never constitutes a unified whole.

The nudes, with large, quiet eyes, stand rigid, like mannequins. Their stiff, round bodies are flesh-colored, black and white. That is the style of 1906.

In the foreground, however, alien to the style of the rest of the painting, appear a crouching figure and a bowl of fruit. These forms are drawn angularly, not roundly modeled in chiaroscuro. The colors are luscious blue, strident yellow, next to pure black and white. This is the beginning of Cubism, the first upsurge, a desperate titanic clash with all of the problems at once. (Kahnweiler, 1920)

And Cottington following through notes that "the problems were quite unrelated, however, to the picture's subject of an encounter with five naked staring whores (even though Kahnweiler's choice of adjectives seems to have registered its affect)".

These problems were the basic tasks of painting: to represent three dimensions and color on a flat surface, and to comprehend them in the unity of that surface... Not the simulation of form by chiaroscuro, but the depiction of the three dimensional through drawing on a flat surface...(Kahnweiler, 1920)

Kahnweiler's conclusion, similar to those leveled against Cézanne, was that Picasso's painting 'never constitutes a unified whole' and was thus unsuccessful. "After months of the most laborious searching, notes Kahnweiler, "Picasso realized that the complete solution of the problem did not lie in this direction". In July 1916, Les Demoiselles was exhibited to the public for the first time, and not in the gallery of Kahnweiler. It was included in the Salon d'Antin, an exhibition organized by André Salmon.

Bypassing the problem of color, simply by eliminating color from his paintings, Picasso in 1908 concentrated on form. Kahnweiler notes:

"Thus Picasso painted figures resembling Congo sculptures, and still lifes of the simplest form. His perspective in these works is similar to that of Cézanne. Light is never more than a means to create form — through chiaroscuro, since he did not at this time repeat the unsuccessful attempt of 1907 to create form through drawing."

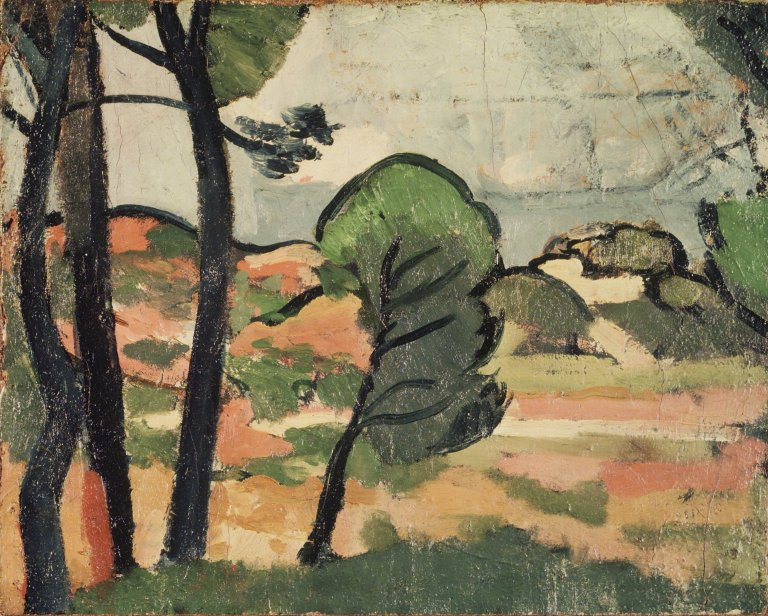
André Derain, c. 1908, Landscape in Provence (Paysage de Provence), oil on canvas, 32.2 × 40.6 cm, Brooklyn Museum, New York

"Derain, too, had abandoned decorative light painting in 1907", Kahnweiler writes, "preceding Braque by a few months. But from the outset, their roads were diverse. Derain's endeavor to retain fidelity to nature in his painting separates him forever from Cubism, no matter how closely his ideas may otherwise parallel those of Braque."

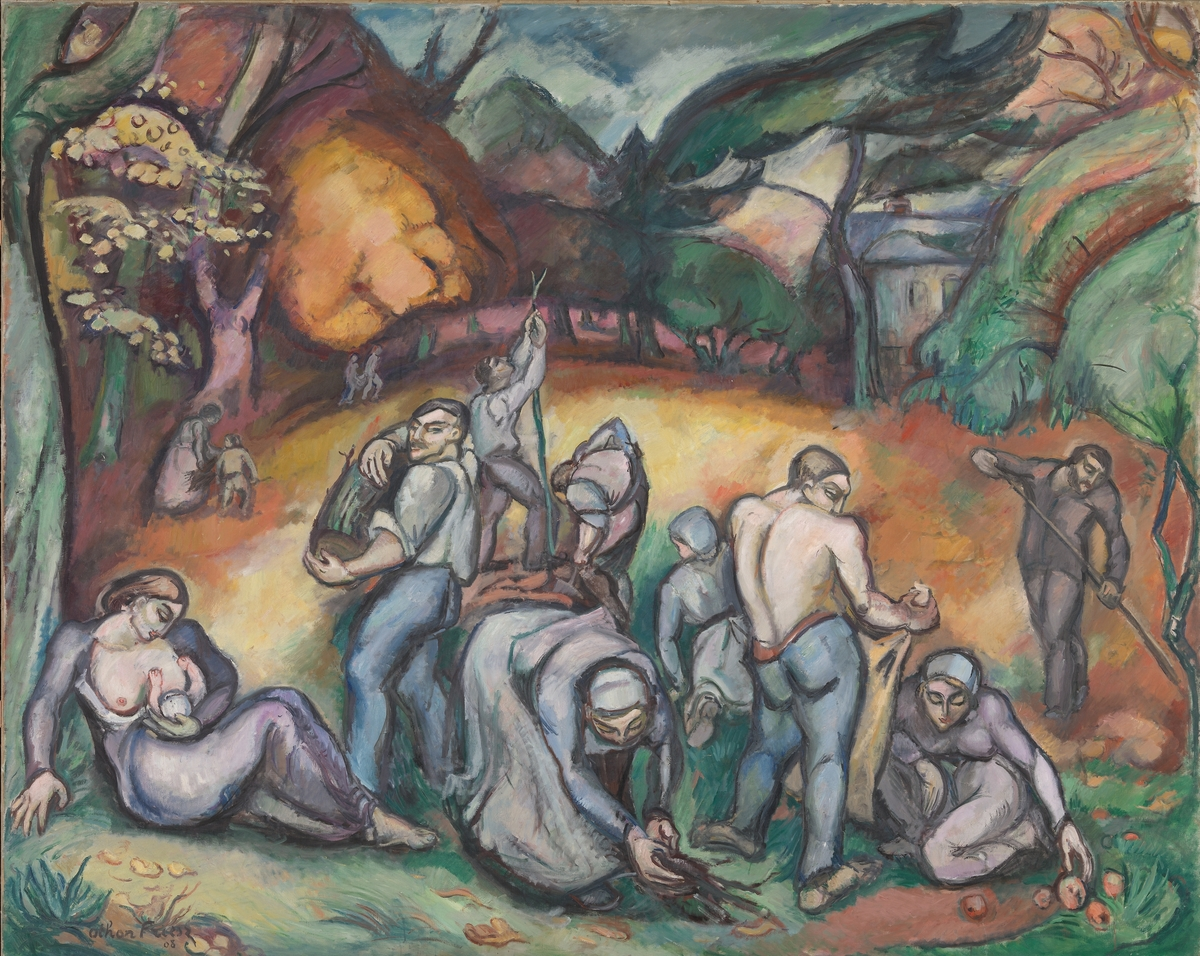
Othon Friesz, 1907–08, Le Travail à l'Automne, oil on canvas, 200.5 × 250 cm, National Museum of Art, Architecture and Design, Oslo

And Derain was not the only one to venture along the path of Cézanne, only to turn away from it in the coming years. Chagall, Friesz, Matisse, Dufy, Redon, Vlaminck and Modigliani are prime examples.

But too, just as Picasso and Braque, other artists independently and simultaneously explored the Cézannian approach, and did continue on to become Cubists, each with his or her own particular style.

== The sequence of events ==
The Fauvism of Matisse and Derain was practically over by the spring of the 1907 Salon des Indépendants. And by the Salon d'Automne in the fall of 1907 it had ended for many others as well. The shift from expressing bright pure colors loosely applied to the canvas gave way to a more calculated geometric approach. Simplified form began to overtake the representational aspect of the works. For Metzinger and Delaunay, too, representational form gave way to a new complexity; the subject matter of the paintings progressively became dominated by a network of interconnected geometric planes, the distinction between foreground and background no longer sharply delineated, and the depth of field limited. And Picasso had almost completed Les Demoiselles d'Avignon.

=== 1907 ===
- The 1907 Salon d'Automne impels Apollinaire to refer to Matisse as the "fauve of fauves". Works by both Derain and Matisse are criticized for the ugliness of their models. Braque and Le Fauconnier are considered as Fauves by the critic Michel Puy (brother of Jean Puy). Robert Delaunay showed one work, André Lhote showed three, Patrick Henry Bruce three, Jean Crotti one, Fernand Léger five, Raymond Duchamp-Villon two, Raoul Dufy three, André Derain exhibited three paintings and Henri Matisse seven works.
- Metzinger and Delaunay are singled out by Louis Vauxcelles as Divisionists who used large, mosaic-like 'cubes' to construct small but highly symbolic compositions.

=== 1908 ===
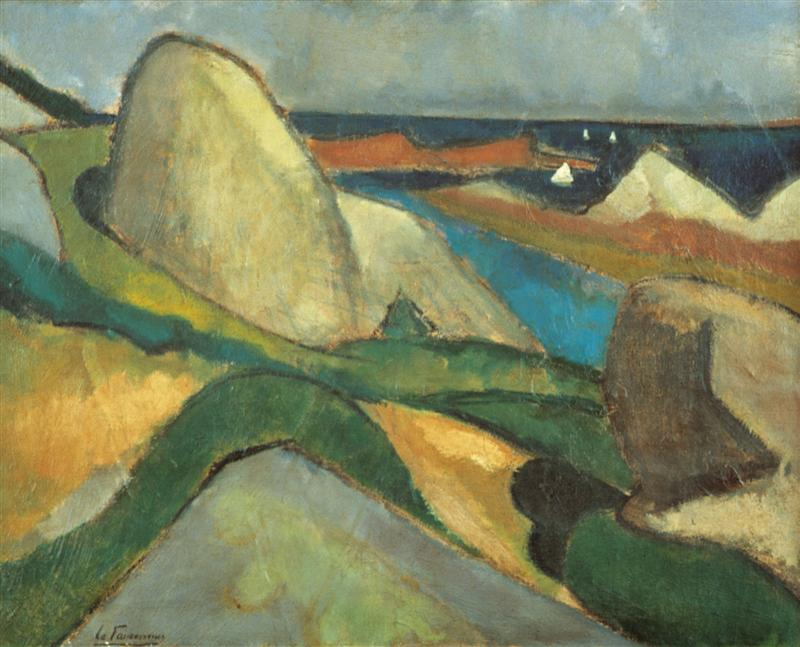
Henri Le Fauconnier, 1908, Ploumanac'h, Museum Kranenburgh, Bergen, the Netherlands

- At the Indépendants of 1908, a painting by Braque strikes Apollinaire by its originality. Though not listed in the catalog, it was described in L'Intransigeant. In his review published in La Revue des lettres et des arts (1 May 1908), Apollinaire claims that Braque's work is the most original presented at the salon. Even in the absence of Matisse and Picasso, Vauxcelles, in Gil Blas (20 March 1908) refers to the most innovative artists of the exposition as 'barbarous schematizers'... who want to create an 'abstract art'.
- An exhibition at Galerie Notre-Dame-des-Champs (Paris) includes Jean Metzinger, Georges Braque, Sonia Delaunay, André Derain, Raoul Dufy, Auguste Herbin, Jules Pascin and Pablo Picasso.
- 1908 continues with the Salon de la Toison d'Or, Moscow: Braque, Derain, Metzinger, van Dongen, Friesz, Manguin, Marquet, Matisse, Puy, Valtat and others exhibit. At the 1909 Salon d'Automne, Constantin Brâncuși exhibits with Henri Le Fauconnier, Fernand Léger and Jean Metzinger.

This exhibition was reviewed in the New York Herald 20 March 1908; by Vauxcelles in Gil Blas 20 March 1908; by C. Le Senne in Le Courrier du Soir, 22 March 1908; and by Maurice Denis, in La Grande revue, 10 April 1908.

- Six landscapes painted at L'Estaque signed Georges Braque were presented to the Jury of the Salon d'Automne: Guérin, Marquet, Rouault and Matisse rejected Braque's entire submission. Guérin and Marquet elected to keep two in play. Braque withdrew the two in protest, placing the blame on Matisse. Louis Vauxcelles recounts how Matisse told him at the time, "Braque has just sent in a painting made of little cubes".

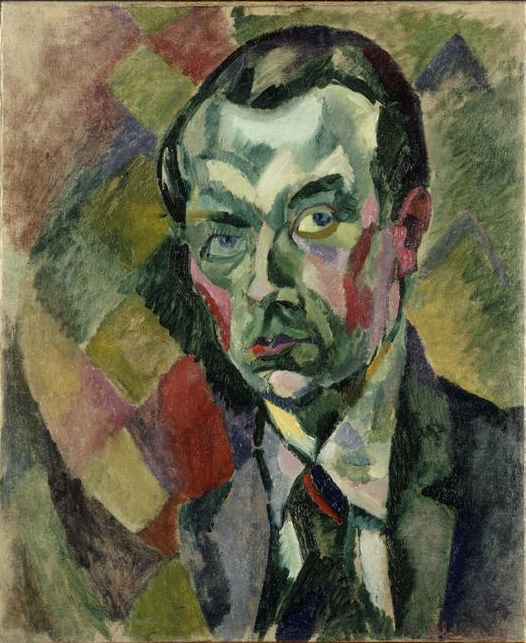
Robert Delaunay, 1909, Autoportrait (Self portrait), oil on canvas, 73 × 59.4 cm (28 3/4 × 23 3/8 in), MNAM, Centre Georges Pompidou, Paris

It is not known to which painting Matisse had referred, but it has been speculated to be Houses at l'Estaque (1908), a prototypical proto-Cubist period painting consisting both of Cézannian trees and houses depicted in the absence of any unifying perspective. Houses in the background do, however, appear smaller than those of the foreground, consistent with classical perspective.

- Following the rejection of Braque's paintings, Kahnweiler offers the artist a one-person show at his claustrophobic gallery on a small street situated behind La Madeleine, Paris. Apollinaire writes of the paintings exhibited nothing about cubes, but mentions "the synthetic motifs he paints" and that he "no longer owes anything to his surroundings". It was Vauxcelles who called Braque a daring man who despises form, "reducing everything, places and a figures and houses, to geometric schemas, to cubes.

=== 1909 ===
According to John Golding's influential history of Cubism published in 1959, it was at the Salon des Indépendants of 1909, held 25 March through 2 May, that the first Cubist painting was exhibited to the public: Little Harbor in Normandy (Petit port en Normandie), no. 215, entitled Paysage, by Georges Braque (Art Institute of Chicago). In Room 16 hung works by Derain, Dufy, Friesz, Laprade, Matisse, Jean Puy, Rouault and Vlaminck.

- At the 1909 Automne, Henri Le Fauconnier exhibited a proto-Cubist portrait of the French writer, novelist and poet Pierre Jean Jouve, drawing the attention of Albert Gleizes who had been working in a similar geometric style. Constantin Brâncuși exhibited alongside Metzinger, Le Fauconnier and Fernand Léger.
- The evolution towards a more rectilinear style with simplified forms continues with greater emphasis on clear geometric principles (derived from the works of Cézanne) not solely visible in the works of Braque, but too in the works of Metzinger, Gleizes, Le Fauconnier and Delaunay (Picasso being absent from the salons).

=== 1910 ===
Pablo Picasso, 1909–10, Figure dans un Fauteuil (Seated Nude, Femme nue assise), oil on canvas, 92.1 × 73 cm, Tate Modern, London. This painting from the collection of Wilhelm Uhde was confiscated by the French state and sold at the Hôtel Drouot in 1921

- At the 1910 Salon des Indépendants Albert Gleizes exhibits Portrait de René Arcos and L'Arbre, two paintings in which the emphasis on simplified geometric form overwhelms to a large extent the representational interest of the painting. The same tendency is evident in Metzinger's Portrait of Apollinaire (1909) exhibited in the same salon. According to Apollinaire this was the "first Cubist portrait (a portrait of myself)". Apollinaire himself has pointed out in his book The Cubist Painters (1913), Metzinger, following Picasso and Braque, was chronologically the third Cubist artist. Jean Metzinger, the same year, managed to convince the jury of the Salon d'Automne to admit some highly geometric paintings into the exhibition.

According to Robert Delaunay himself, the Salle II of the 1910 Salon des Indépendants was "the first collective manifestation of a new art [un art naissant]".

- At the Salon d'Automne of 1910, held from 1 October to 8 November, Jean Metzinger introduced an extreme form of what would soon be labeled Cubism, not just to the general public for the first time, but to other artists that had no contact with Picasso or Braque. Though others were already working in a proto-cubist vein with complex Cézannian geometries and unconventional perspectives, Metzinger's Nude represented a radical departure further still.

I have in front of me a small cutting from an evening newspaper, The Press, on the subject of the 1910 Salon d'Automne. It gives a good idea of the situation in which the new pictorial tendency, still barely perceptible, found itself: The geometrical fallacies of Messrs. Metzinger, Le Fauconnier, and Gleizes. No sign of any compromise there. Braque and Picasso only showed in Kahnweiler's gallery and we were unaware of them. Robert Delaunay, Metzinger and Le Fauconnier had been noticed at the Salon des Indépendants of that same year, 1910, without a label being fixed on them. Consequently, although much effort has been put into proving the opposite, the word Cubism was not at that time current. (Albert Gleizes, 1925)

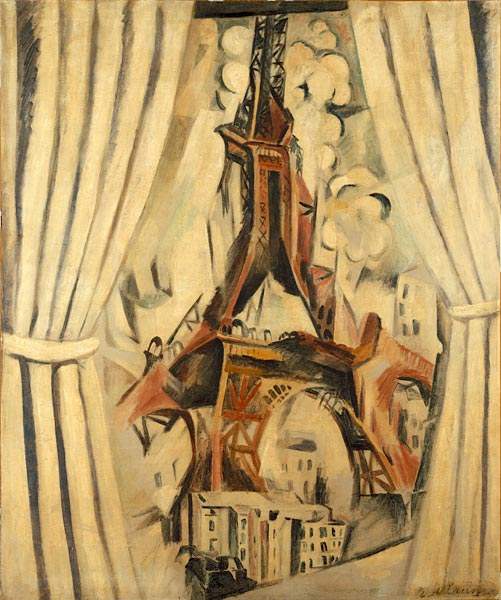
Robert Delaunay, 1910, View over the Eiffel Tower, oil on canvas, 116 × 97 cm, Kunstsammlung Nordrhein-Westfalen

In a review of the Salon, the poet Roger Allard (1885–1961) announces the appearance of a new school of French painters concentrating their attention on form rather than on color. A group forms that includes Gleizes, Metzinger, Delaunay (a friend and associate of Metzinger), and Fernand Léger. They meet regularly at Henri Le Fauconnier's studio near the Bld de Montparnasse, where he is working on his ambitious allegorical painting entitled L'Abondance. "In this painting" writes Brooke, "the simplification of the representational form gives way to a new complexity in which foreground and background are united and the subject of the painting obscured by a network of interlocking geometrical elements".

This exhibition preceded the 1911 Salon des Indépendants which officially introduced "Cubism" to the public as an organized group movement. Metzinger had been close to Picasso and Braque, working at this time along similar lines.

Metzinger, Henri Le Fauconnier and Fernand Léger exhibited coincidentally in Room VIII. This was the moment in which the Montparnasse group quickly grew to include Roger de La Fresnaye, Alexander Archipenko and Joseph Csaky. The three Duchamp brothers, Marcel Duchamp, Jacques Villon and Raymond Duchamp-Villon, and another artist known as Picabia took part in the exhibition.

- Following this salon Metzinger writes the article Note sur la peinture, in which he compares the similarities in the works Picasso, Braque, Delaunay, Gleizes and Le Fauconnier. In doing so he enunciated for the first time, not the term "Cubism", but what would become known as the characteristics of Cubism: notably the notions of simultaneity and mobile perspective. In this seminal text Metzinger stressed the distance between their works and traditional perspective. These artists, he wrote, granted themselves 'the liberty of moving around objects', and combining many different views in one image, each recording varying experiences over the course of time.

Jean Metzinger, 1910, Nu à la cheminée (Nude), exhibited at the 1910 Salon d'Automne. Published in The Cubist Painters, Aesthetic Meditations by Guillaume Apollinaire in 1913, location unknown

Georges Braque, 1910, Violin and Candlestick, oil on canvas, 60.9 × 50.1 cm, San Francisco Museum of Modern Art

Pablo Picasso, 1910, Girl with a Mandolin (Fanny Tellier), oil on canvas, 100.3 × 73.6 cm, Museum of Modern Art, New York

Georges Braque, 1910, Femme tenant une Mandoline, 92 × 73 cm, Bayerische Staatsgemäldesammlungen, Munich

Once launched at the 1910 Salon d'Automne, the burgeoning movement would rapidly spread throughout Paris.

- After the 1910 Salon d'Automne, the writer Gelett Burgess begins a series of interviews with the avant-garde working currently in Paris and surrounding banlieues. These interviews and Burgess' impressions of the works produced are published in Architectural Record, May 1910.
- According to Gleizes' memoirs, Mercereau introduces him to Metzinger but only after the Salon d'Automne do they become seriously interested in each other's work.
- Louis Vauxcelles, in his review of the 26th Salon des Indépendants (1910), made a passing and imprecise reference to Metzinger, Gleizes, Delaunay, Léger and Le Fauconnier, as "ignorant geometers, reducing the human body, the site, to pallid cubes."

The work of Metzinger, Le Fauconnier and Robert Delaunay were exhibited together. Le Fauconnier showed the geometrically simplified Ploumanac'h landscapes: Le Ravin and Village dans les Montagne, along with Femme à l'éventail and Portrait of Maroussia. In the same hall hung the works of Matisse, Vlaminck, Dufy, Laurencin, van Dongen and Henri Rousseau.

== Cubism ==
"The question of when Cubism began and who led the way in its development", writes art historian Christopher Green, "is inextricably tied up with the question of what distinguishes Cubist art, how it can be defined and who can be called Cubist". Picasso's landscapes painted at Horta de Hebro in 1909 (executed two years after Les Demoiselles and one year after the "cubes" of Braque's L'Estaque paintings) were considered the first Cubist painting by Gertrude Stein. It is generally recognized, however, that the first Cubist exhibition transpired in 1911. Jean Metzinger, judging from the Burgess interview, appears to have abandoned his Divisionist style in favor of the faceting of form associated with analytic Cubism around 1908 or early 1909. Metzinger frequented the Bateau Lavoir at this time and exhibited with Braque at the Berthe Weill gallery. By 1910, the robust form of early analytic Cubism of Picasso (Girl with a Mandolin, Fanny Tellier, 1910), Braque (Violin and Candlestick, 1910) and Metzinger (Nu à la cheminée (Nude), 1910) had become practically indistinguishable.

In his article entitled Note sur la peinture, published the same year, Metzinger acknowledges the birth of a new kind of painting; one that employed a mobile perspective. In that seminal text, Metzinger identifies similarities in the works of Robert Delaunay and Henri Le Fauconnier, on the one hand, Pablo Picasso and Georges Braque on the other. Of this group of five, only Metzinger and Braque were familiar with the works of Picasso, and Metzinger alone, familiar with the works of everyone in the group. It is now universally believed that Metzinger was the first to recognize explicitly and implicitly the significance of the use of "a free, mobile perspective", and the "mixing... of the successive and the simultaneous". He was the first to write of the fact that artists had abandoned traditional perspective and were now free to move around their subjects to paint them from various points in space, and at various moments in time. Metzinger's role at center of Cubism both as a painter and theorist prompted Guillaume Apollinaire to write of Picasso, Braque and Metzinger as the first three Cubist painters.

Now well beyond the teachings of Cézanne, the newly formed Montparnasse group (who held meetings not just at Le Fauconnier's studio, but at the cafés Le Dôme, La Coupole, La Closerie des Lilas, Le Select, and Café de la Rotonde) together with other young painters who also want to emphasize a research into form (as opposed to color) take over the hanging committee of the Salon des Indépendants ensuring that the works of a small group of artists would be shown together: Gleizes, Metzinger, Le Fauconnier, Delaunay, Léger and Marie Laurencin (at the request of Apollinaire) are shown in Room 41.

=== 1911 Salon des Indépendants ===
The first group exhibition of Cubism transpired at the 1911 Indépendants. The result of the group show is a major scandal. Both the public and the press are outraged by the obscurity of the subject matter, represented as cones, cubes and spheres. The predominance of sharp geometrical faceting and the fact that a group of artists are all working in similar directions, gives rise to the term 'Cubism'. Although similar terms (i.e., "cubes") have been used before in relation to the works of Cross (1901), Metzinger and Delaunay (1906, 1907) and Braque (1908), the term "Cubism" emerges for the first time at the inauguration of the 1911 Salon des Indépendants; imposed by 'scandal-mongering journalists who wished to create sensational news' (to use the words of Gleizes). The term was used derogatorily to describe the diverse geometric concerns reflected in the paintings of five artists in continual communication with one another: Metzinger, Gleizes, Delaunay, Le Fauconnier and Léger (but not Picasso or Braque, both absent from this massive exhibition).

Guillaume Apollinaire, deeming it necessary to deflect the endless attacks throughout the press, accepts the term "Cubism" (the "ism" signifying a tendency of behavior, action or opinion belonging to a class or group of persons (an art movement); the result of an ideology or principle).

The term "Cubisme" is employed for the first time outside France in June 1911 by Apollinaire, speaking in the context of an exhibition in Brussels which includes works by Archipenko, Gleizes, Delaunay, Léger, Metzinger, Segonzac, Le Fauconnier, and Jean Marchand. Apollinaire's impulse was to define L'Esprit nouveau observed in a range of paintings, from proto-Cubist quasi-Fauve landscapes to the semi-abstract geometric compositions of artists such as Metzinger, Delaunay, Gleizes and a growing group of followers. In his chapter on Picasso, however, there is no mention of the term Cubism.

Before the Indépendance, the Cubists infiltrated the placement committee to make sure they would all be shown as a group. Le Fauconnier, the secretary of the salon, facilitated the goal of hanging their works together. Until then, works had been placed according to alphabetical order of the artists names. In Room 41 hung works by Gleizes, Léger, Delaunay, Le Fauconnier, Archipenko, and Metzinger (now described as "the Emperor of Cubism"). In room 43 hung works by André Lhote, Roger de La Fresnaye, André Dunoyer de Segonzac, Luc-Albert Moreau and André Mare.

In room 42 was a retrospective exhibition of Henri (Le Douanier) Rousseau, who died 2 September 1910. Articles and reviews were numerous and extensive in sheer words employed; including in Gil Blas, Comoedia, Excelsior, Action, L'Oeuvre, and Cri de Paris. Apollinaire wrote a long review in the 20 April 1911 issue of L'Intransigeant.

Henri Le Fauconnier's Abundance, 1910-11 (Haags Gemeentemuseum, Den Haag), partly due to its large size and partly to the treatment of its subject matter, was an eye-catcher, causing a sensation. This painting was soon bought by the Dutchman art critic and painter Conrad Kickert (1882–1965), who was secretary of the Contemporary Art Society (Moderne Kunstkring). In 1934 he donated the painting to the Gemeentemuseum, Den Haag.

=== 1911 Salon d'Automne ===
Another Cubist scandal is produced at the Salon d'Automne of 1911. The Indépendants exhibitors develop relations with the Duchamp brothers, Jacques Villon, Raymond Duchamp-Villon and Marcel Duchamp. The studios of Jacques Villon and Raymond Duchamp-Villon at 7, rue Lemaître, become, together with Gleizes' studio at Courbevoie, regular meeting places for the newly formed Groupe de Puteaux (soon to exhibit under the name Section d'Or). František Kupka, the Czech painter interested in non-representational painting based on analogies with music and the progressive abstraction of a subject in motion, joins the discussions.

Jean Metzinger, 1911, Le goûter (Tea Time), 75.9 × 70.2 cm, Philadelphia Museum of Art. Exhibited at the 1911 Salon d'Automne. André Salmon dubbed this painting "The Mona Lisa of Cubism"

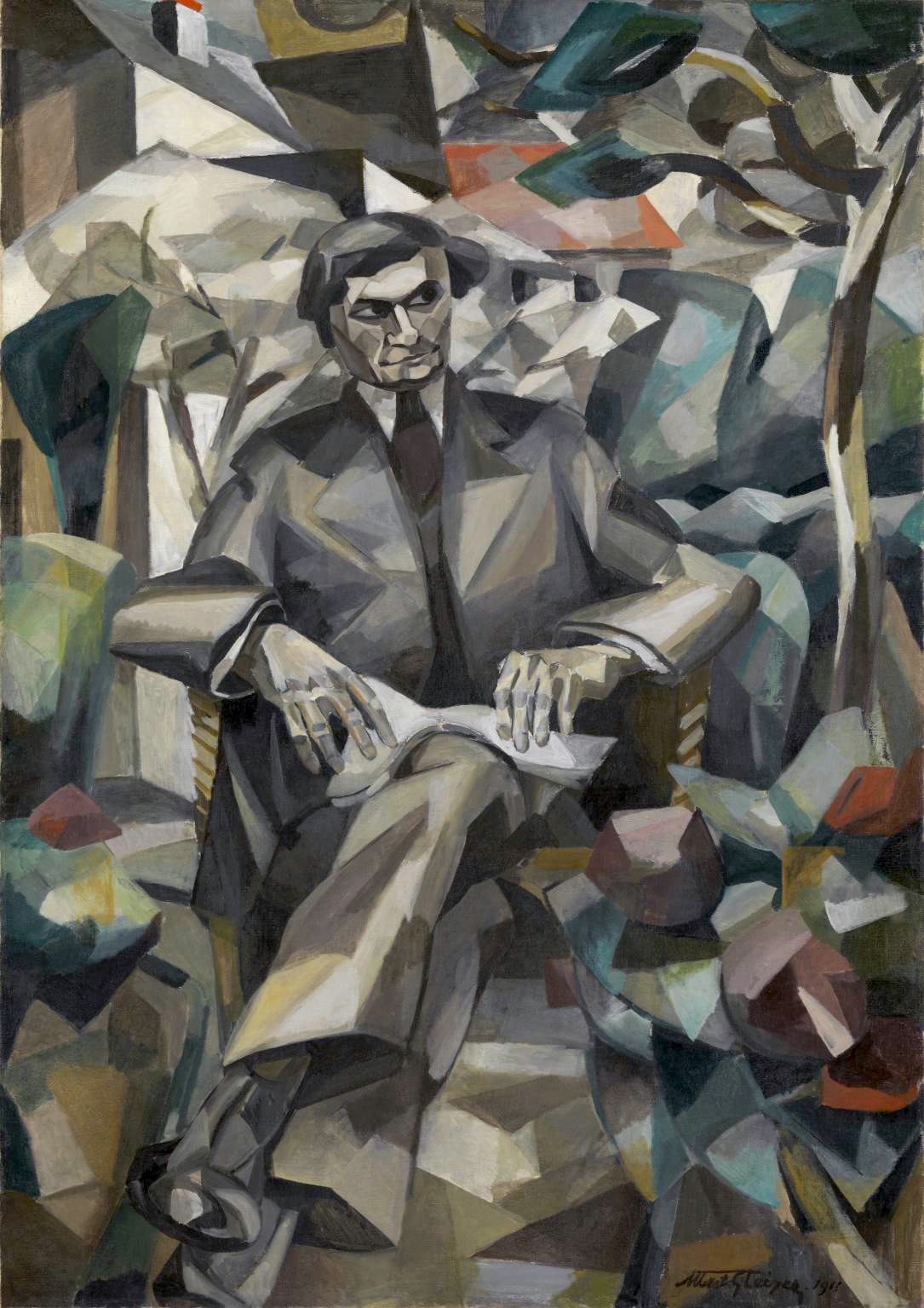
Albert Gleizes, 1911, Portrait de Jacques Nayral, oil on canvas, 161.9 × 114 cm, Tate Modern, London. This painting was reproduced in Fantasio: published 15 October 1911, for the occasion of the Salon d'Automne where it was exhibited the same year.

In Room 7 and 8 of the 1911 Salon d'Automne, held at the Grand Palais in Paris, hung works by Metzinger (Le goûter (Tea Time)), Henri Le Fauconnier, Fernand Léger, Albert Gleizes, Roger de La Fresnaye, André Lhote, Jacques Villon, Marcel Duchamp, František Kupka, Alexander Archipenko, Joseph Csaky and Francis Picabia. The result was a public scandal which brought Cubism to the attention of the general public for the second time. The first was the organized group showing by Cubists in Salle 41 of the 1911 Salon des Indépendants. In room 41 hung the work of Gleizes, Metzinger, Léger, Delaunay, Le Fauconnier and Archipenko. Articles in the press could be found in Gil Blas, Comoedia, Excelsior, Action, L'Oeuvre, Cri de Paris. Apollinaire wrote a long review in the 20 April 1911 issue of L'Intransigeant. Thus Cubism spread into the literary world of writers, poets, critics, and art historians.

Apollinaire took Picasso to the opening of the Salon d'Automne in 1911 to see the cubist works in Room 7 and 8.

Albert Gleizes writes of the Salon d'Automne of 1911: "With the Salon d'Automne of that same year, 1911, the fury broke out again, just as violent as it had been at the Indépendants." He writes: "The painters were the first to be surprised by the storms they had let loose without intending to, merely because they had hung on the wooden bars that run along the walls of the Cours-la-Reine, certain paintings that had been made with great care, with passionate conviction, but also in a state of great anxiety."

It was from that moment on that the word Cubism began to be widely used. [...]

Never had the critics been so violent as they were at that time. From which it became clear that these paintings - and I specify the names of the painters who were, alone, the reluctant causes of all this frenzy: Jean Metzinger, Le Fauconnier, Fernand Léger, Robert Delaunay and myself - appeared as a threat to an order that everyone thought had been established forever.

In nearly all the papers, all composure was lost. The critics would begin by saying: there is no need to devote much space to the Cubists, who are utterly without importance and then they furiously gave them seven columns out of the ten that were taken up, at that time, by the Salon. (Gleizes, 1925)

Reviewing the Salon d'Automne of 1911, Huntly Carter in The New Age writes that "art is not an accessory to life; it is life itself carried to the greatest heights of personal expression." Carter continues:

It was at the Salon d'Automne, amid the Rhythmists [Cubists], I found the desired sensation. The exuberant eagerness and vitality of their region, consisting of two room remotely situated, was a complete contrast to the morgue I was compelled to pass through in order to reach it. Though marked by extremes, it was clearly the starting point of a new movement in painting, perhaps the most remarkable in modern times, It revealed not only that artists are beginning to recognise the unity of art and life, but that some of them have discovered life is based on rhythmic vitality, and underlying all things is the perfect rhythm that continues and unites them. Consciously, or unconsciously, many are seeking for the perfect rhyth, and in so doing are attaining a liberty or wideness of expression unattained through several centuries of painting. (Huntly Carter, 1911)

Gleizes and Metzinger render homage to Cézanne in their 1912 Cubist manifesto Du "Cubisme":

"To understand Cézanne is to foresee Cubism. Henceforth we are justified in saying that between this school and previous manifestations there is only a difference of intensity, and that in order to assure ourselves of this we have only to study the methods of this realism, which, departing from the superficial reality of Courbet, plunges with Cézanne into profound reality, growing luminous as it forces the unknowable to retreat. (Jean Metzinger and Albert Gleizes, 1912)

== Notable artists ==
- Constantin Brâncuși
- Georges Braque
- Paul Cézanne
- Joseph Csaky
- Robert Delaunay
- Sonia Delaunay
- André Derain
- Kees van Dongen
- Raoul Dufy
- Henri Le Fauconnier
- Roger de La Fresnaye
- Othon Friesz
- Paul Gauguin
- Albert Gleizes
- Bohumil Kubišta
- František Kupka
- Marie Laurencin
- Fernand Léger
- Jean Metzinger
- Amedeo Modigliani
- Piet Mondrian
- Francis Picabia
- Pablo Picasso
- Odilon Redon
- Henri Rousseau
- André Dunoyer de Segonzac
- Paul Sérusier
- Georges Seurat
- Gino Severini
- Maurice de Vlaminck

== See also ==
- Crystal Cubism
- The Cubist Painters, Aesthetic Meditations
- Cubist sculpture
- Fourth dimension in art
