= Houses at l'Estaque =

Painting by Georges Braque

- Artist: Georges Braque
- Year: 1908
- Medium: Oil on canvas
- Dimensions: 40.5 cm × 32.5 cm (15.9 in × 12.7 in)
- Location: Lille Métropole Museum of Modern, Contemporary and Outsider Art; Lille

Houses at l'Estaque (French: Maisons à l'Estaque, or Maisons et arbre) is an oil-on-canvas painting by Georges Braque executed in 1908. It is considered either an important Proto-Cubist landscape or the first Cubist landscape. The painting prompted art critic Henri Matisse to mock it as being composed of cubes which led to the name of the movement.

It is a response to works by Paul Cézanne who also lived in L'Estaque at times.

== History ==
This painting by Braque was refused at the Salon d'Automne in 1908. Louis Vauxcelles recounted how Henri Matisse told him at the time, "Braque has just sent in [to the 1908 Salon d'Automne] a painting made of little cubes". The critic Charles Morice relayed Matisse's words and spoke of Braque's little cubes. The motif of the viaduct at l'Estaque had inspired Braque to produce three paintings marked by the simplification of form and deconstruction of perspective. Six landscapes painted at L'Estaque signed Georges Braque were presented to the Jury of the Salon d'Automne: Guérin, Georges Rouault, and Matisse rejected Braque's entire submission. Guérin and Albert Marquet elected to keep two in play. Braque withdrew the two in protest, placing the blame on Matisse.

Georges Braque, 1908, Maisons à l'Estaque (Houses at l'Estaque), oil on canvas, 73 x 59.5 cm, Kunstmuseum Bern

Houses at l'Estaque is a Proto-Cubist painting consisting both of Cézannian trees and houses depicted in the absence of any unifying perspective. Houses in the background do, however, appear smaller than those of the foreground, consistent with classical perspective. Following the rejection of Braque's paintings, Daniel-Henry Kahnweiler offered the artist a one-person show at his gallery on a small street situated behind La Madeleine, Paris. Guillame Apollinaire wrote of the paintings exhibited nothing about cubes, but mentions "the synthetic motifs he paints" and that he "no longer owes anything to his surroundings". It was Vauxcelles who called Braque a daring man who despises form, "reducing everything, places and a figures and houses, to geometric schemas, to cubes".

== See also ==
- The Viaduct at L'Estaque (Le Viaduc à L'Estaque) 1908
