= Bathers (Metzinger) =

Painting by Jean Metzinger

- Baigneuses (French)
- Artist: Jean Metzinger
- Year: c. 1908
- Type: Black & white reproduction
- Medium: Painting
- Dimensions: Unknown
- Location: Whereabouts unknown

Bathers (French: Baigneuses) is a Proto-Cubist painting, now lost or missing, created circa 1908 by the French artist and theorist Jean Metzinger. Possibly exhibited during the spring of 1908 at the Salon des Indépendants (n. 4243). This black-and-white image of Metzinger's painting, the only known photograph of the work, was reproduced in Gelett Burgess, "The Wild Men of Paris", Architectural Record, May 1910. The painting was also reproduced in The New York Times, 8 October 1911, in an article titled "The 'Cubists' Dominate Paris' Fall Salon", and subtitled, "Eccentric School of Painting Increases Its Vogue in the Current Art Exhibition - What Its Followers Attempt to Do".

== Description ==
Baigneuses, likely an oil painting on canvas (as practically all Metzingers' works of the period), was painted in a vertical format with unknown dimensions.

The work represents at least four nude women (or bathers) relaxing in a highly abstract landscape with vegetation and a small body of water visible through reflections and from the woman on the left whose legs are submerged from the knees down. The central figure holds the trunk of a tree with her left arm and a woman with her right, forming a tight central mass. The two nudes at the center, treated in a light color, stand-out against a darker background. They are flanked on both sides by a standing and a sitting nude.

The colors of the painting, as well as its dimensions and whereabouts, are unknown.

== The Wild Men of Paris ==
Leading up to 1910, the draftsman, illustrator and poet Gelett Burgess interviewed and wrote about artists and artworks in and around Paris. The result of Burgess' investigation was published after he visited the 1910 Salon des Indépendants, the massive anti-establishment art exhibition in Paris, and one year before the scandalous group exhibition that brought Cubism to the attention of the general public. At the 1910 Indépendants Jean Metzinger showed his Portrait of Apollinaire (the first Cubist portrait according to Guillaume Apollinaire); Albert Gleizes showed his Portrait de René Arcos and L'Arbre (The Tree), paintings in which the emphasis on simplified geometric form overwhelms representational interests. Louis Vauxcelles in his review of the 1910 Salon des Indépendants made a passing and imprecise reference to Metzinger, Gleizes, Delaunay, Léger and Le Fauconnier, as "ignorant geometers, reducing the human body, the site, to pallid cubes." The works of Metzinger, Le Fauconnier and Delaunay were exhibited together. Le Fauconnier showed the geometrically simplified Ploumanac'h landscapes: Le Ravin and Village dans les Montagne, along with Femme à l'éventail and Portrait of Maroussia. In the same exhibition hung the works of Henri Matisse, Maurice de Vlaminck, Raoul Dufy, Marie Laurencin, Kees van Dongen and Henri Rousseau.

Gelett Burgess writes in The Wild Men of Paris of the same exhibition:

There were no limits to the audacity and the ugliness of the canvasses. Still-life sketches of round, round apples and yellow, yellow oranges, on square, square tables, seen in impossible perspective; landscapes of squirming trees, with blobs of virgin color gone wrong, fierce greens and coruscating yellows, violent purples, sickening reds and shuddering blues.

But the nudes! They looked like flayed Martians, like pathological charts—hideous old women, patched with gruesome hues, lopsided, with arms like the arms of a Swastika, sprawling on vivid backgrounds, or frozen stiffly upright, glaring through misshapen eyes, with noses or fingers missing. They defied anatomy, physiology, almost geometry itself!

Jean Metzinger, c.1905, Baigneuses, Deux nus dans un jardin exotique (Two Nudes in an Exotic Landscape), oil on canvas, 116 x 88.8 cm, Colección Carmen Thyssen-Bornemisza, Spain

After the death of Paul Cézanne in 1906, his paintings were exhibited in Paris in the form of several large exhibitions and a retrospective at the Salon d'Automne of 1907, greatly affecting the direction taken by the avant-garde artists in Paris. Prior to the advent of Cubism, Cézanne's geometric simplifications and optical phenomena inspired not just Metzinger, Matisse, Derain and Braque, but the other artists who earlier exhibited with the Fauves. Those who had not transited through a Fauve stage, such as Picasso, also experimented with the complex fracturing of form. Cézanne had thus sparked a wholesale transformation in the area of artistic investigation that would profoundly affect the development modern art. The Fauvism of Metzinger, Matisse and Derain was virtually over by the spring of 1907. And by the Salon d'Automne of 1907 it had ended for many others as well. The shift from bright pure colors loosely applied to the canvas gave way to a more calculated geometric approach. The priority of simplified form began to overtake the representational aspect of the works. The simplification of representational form gave way to a new complexity; the subject matter of the paintings progressively became dominated by a network of interconnected geometric planes, the distinction between foreground and background no longer sharply delineated, and the depth of field limited.

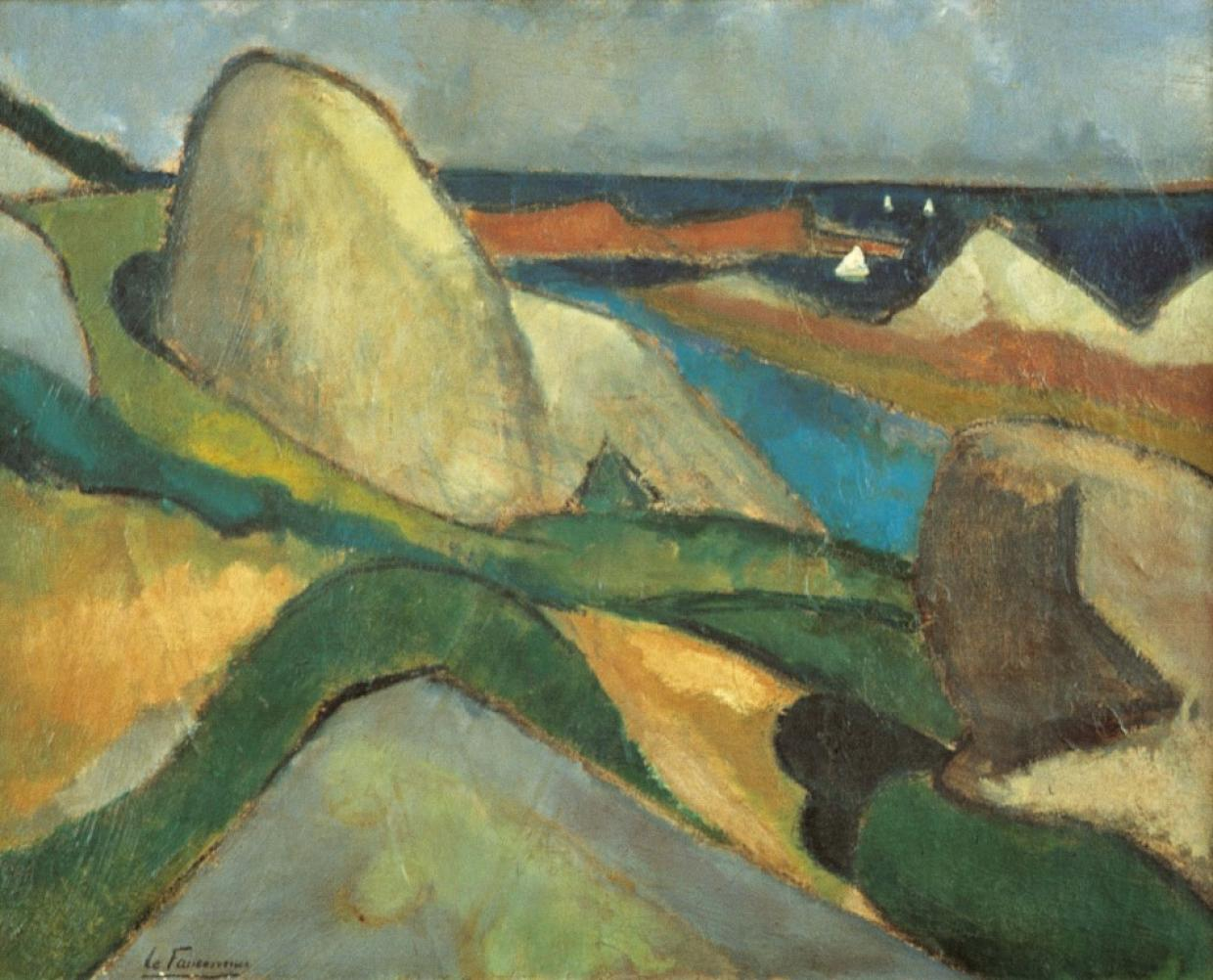
Henri le Fauconnier, 1908, Ploumanac'h, Museum Kranenburgh, Bergen, the Netherlands

Burgess continues:

Though the school was new to me, it was already an old story in Paris. It had been a nine-days’ wonder. Violent discussions had raged over it; it had taken its place as a revolt and held it, despite the fulmination of critics and the contempt of academicians. The school was increasing in numbers, in importance. By many it was taken seriously. At first, the beginners had been called "The Invertebrates." In the Salon of 1905 they were named "The Incoherents." But by 1906, when they grew more perfervid, more audacious, more crazed with theories, they received their present appellation of "Les Fauves"—the Wild Beasts. And so, and so, a-hunting I would go!

Turning his attention to Metzinger's abode, Burgess writes in Architectural Record:

Metzinger once did gorgeous mosaics of pure pigment, each little square of color not quite touching the next, so that an effect of vibrant light should result. He painted exquisite compositions of cloud and cliff and sea; he painted women and made them fair, even as the women upon the boulevards fair. But now, translated into the idiom of subjective beauty, into this strange Neo-Classic language, those same women, redrawn, appear in stiff, crude, nervous lines in patches of fierce color. Surely, Metzinger should know what such things mean. Picasso never painted a pretty woman, though we have noticed that he likes to associate with them. Czobel sees them through the bars of his cage, and roars out tones of mauve and cinnabar. Derain sees them as cones and prisms, and Braque as if they had been sawn out of blocks of wood by carpenters’ apprentices. But Metzinger is more tender towards the sex. He arranges them as flowers are arranged on tapestry and wall paper; he simplifies them to mere patterns, and he carries them gently past the frontier of Poster Land to the world of the Ugly so tenderly that they are not much damaged—only more faint, more vegetable, more anaemic.

What’s Metzinger? A scrupulously polite, well-dressed gentleman as ever was, in a scrupulously neat chamber, with a scrupulously well-ordered mind. He is complete as a wax figure, with long brown eyelashes and a clean-cut face. He affects no idiosyncrasies of manners or dress. One cannot question his earnestness and seriousness or sincerity. He is, perhaps, the most articulate of them all. Let us not call him prim.

"Instead of copying Nature," [Metzinger] says, "we create a milieu of our own, wherein our sentiment can work itself out through a juxtaposition of colors. It is hard to explain it, but it may perhaps be illustrated by analogy with literature and music. Your own Edgar Poe (he pronounced it ‘Ed Carpoe’) did not attempt to reproduce Nature realistically. Some phase of life suggested an emotion, as that of horror in ‘The Fall of the House of Ushur.’ That subjective idea he translated into art. He made a composition of it."

"So, music does not attempt to imitate Nature’s sounds, but it does interpret and embody emotions awakened by Nature through a convention of its own, in a way to be aesthetically pleasing. In some such way, we, taking out hint from Nature, construct decoratively pleasing harmonies and symphonies of color expression of our sentiment." (Jean Metzinger, circa 1909)

== Metzinger, Picasso, and Braque ==
Pablo Picasso, 1908, Paysage aux deux figures (Landscape with Two Figures), oil on canvas, 60 x 73 cm, Musée Picasso, Paris

There is a close association between Metzinger's Baigneuses (Bathers) and Picasso's 1908 Paysage aux deux figures (Landscape with Two Figures). Both stances are verbalized with the same abstract vocabulary. In both cases, the figures are camouflaged or blended with the background, their bodies forming part of the landscape. These works were completed at a time when Metzinger frequented the Bateau Lavoir in Montmartre, where he may have seen Picasso's painting. There are differences, too, worth noting between the two works (aside from the size and colors which are unknown in the Metzinger case). While the dominant feature of Picasso's painting is the landscape, Metzinger chose to highlight the figures; the landscape playing only a secondary role in the overall composition. Metzinger's figures are much larger relative to the canvas. They are prominently and symmetrically displayed, and of lighter color contrast relative to Picasso's asymmetrical juxtaposition and subdued contrasting. Two of Metzinger's nudes—to the right and left of the dominant central figures—are quite inconspicuous, as in Picasso's piece. In both paintings the nudes and landscape have become unified, not presuming a representation of reality.

They are the product of a reductive abstracting process, of an open, freewheeling process of synthesis—where a dialogue between components lead to the liberation from any particular classical foundation. They are combined harmoniously though pictographic imagery rendered in residuum abstractions of apparent mathematical codes. In the case of Metzinger, his prowess in mathematics is well documented. In the case of Picasso, the mathematical association with his paintings has been made through Maurice Princet.

Jean Metzinger, c. 1908, Baigneuses (Bathers), Illustrated in Gelett Burgess, "The Wild Men of Paris", Architectural Record, May 1910, location unknown

Pablo Picasso, 1908, Paysage aux deux figures (Landscape with Two Figures), oil on canvas, 60 x 73 cm, Musée Picasso, Paris, appears to have certain morphological and stylistic similarities with Metzinger's Bathers

Metzinger's early interests in mathematics is well documented. He was familiar with the works of Gauss, Riemann and Jules Henri Poincaré (and perhaps Galilean relativity) prior to the development of Cubism: something that reflects in his pre-1907 works. The French mathematician Maurice Princet promoted the work of Poincaré, along with the concept of the fourth spatial dimension, to artists at the Bateau-Lavoir. He was a close associate of Pablo Picasso, Guillaume Apollinaire, Max Jacob, Marcel Duchamp and Jean Metzinger. Princet is known as "le mathématicien du cubisme." He brought to the attention of these artists a book entitled Traité élémentaire de géométrie à quatre dimensions by Esprit Jouffret (1903) a popularization of Poincaré's Science and Hypothesis. In this book Jouffret described hypercubes and complex polyhedra in four dimensions projected onto a two-dimensional page. Princet became estranged from the group after his wife left him for André Derain. However, Princet would remain close to Metzinger and participate in meetings of the Section d'Or in Puteaux. He gave informal lectures to the artists, many of whom were passionate about mathematical order. In 1910, Metzinger said of him, "[Picasso] lays out a free, mobile perspective, from which that ingenious mathematician Maurice Princet has deduced a whole geometry".

Jean Metzinger, c. 1908, Baigneuses (Bathers), Illustrated in Gelett Burgess, "The Wild Men of Paris", Architectural Record, May 1910, location unknown

Georges Braque, 1908, Le Viaduc de L'Estaque (Viaduct at L'Estaque), oil on canvas, 73 x 60 cm, private collection, appears to have certain morphological and stylistic similarities with Metzinger's Bathers

Picasso's Landscape with Two Figures is almost entirely Cézannian, in its color, in its reduction to simplified forms and in its loose brushwork. Picasso still shows a sense of depth perspective through shading, despite some flattening of the surface. Metzinger's painting is less influenced by Cézanne in its brushstrokes, hardly visible in this photograph. Its quasi-Nabis post-Symbolist treatment can be observed, but Metzinger vacates all depth of field. The background and foreground have become one. The only devices that indicate depth are (1) elevation in the picture plane; lower is closer and further is higher, and (2) objects in front of others obscure the object in the background, such as the central nude appears in front of the nude she holds with her right hand.

In both paintings, the faces of the models have been left out, featureless, reduced to their simplest spherical form.

In light of the fact that Metzinger frequented the Bateau Lavoir since 1908 and exhibited with Georges Braque at Berthe Weill's gallery, introduced to Picasso by Max Jacob and Guillaume Krotowsky (who already signed his works Guillaume Apollinaire), and in view of the similarities between the two works, it is probable that Metzinger's Bathers was painted the same year; 1908. The differences between the two paintings suggest that, while Metzinger may have been influenced by Picasso (unlike Albert Gleizes), his intention was certainly not to copy or even resemble the Spaniard, as would soon Braque (or visa versa). His intention was to create his own brand of art, dependent on his own lived experience.

Then the kingdom of the Fauves whose civilization had appeared so new, so powerful, so startling, took on suddenly the aspect of a deserted village.

It was then that Jean Metzinger, joining Picasso and Braque, founded the Cubist City. (Guillaume Apolllinaire, 1913)

Whether in advanced non-objective mathematical workings or abstract geometrical form, along with his non-representative dislocated outward appearance, Metzinger creates a pure image—"the total image".

By 1908–09, in such studies as Baigneuses (Bathers), it is apparent that Metzinger was not following the lead of Picasso or Braque in their hermetic approach to painting—he had little interest in imitating, whether it be "an orb on a vertical plane" or anything else—Metzinger was on a path leading to abstraction and to the almost total disintegration of recognizable form.

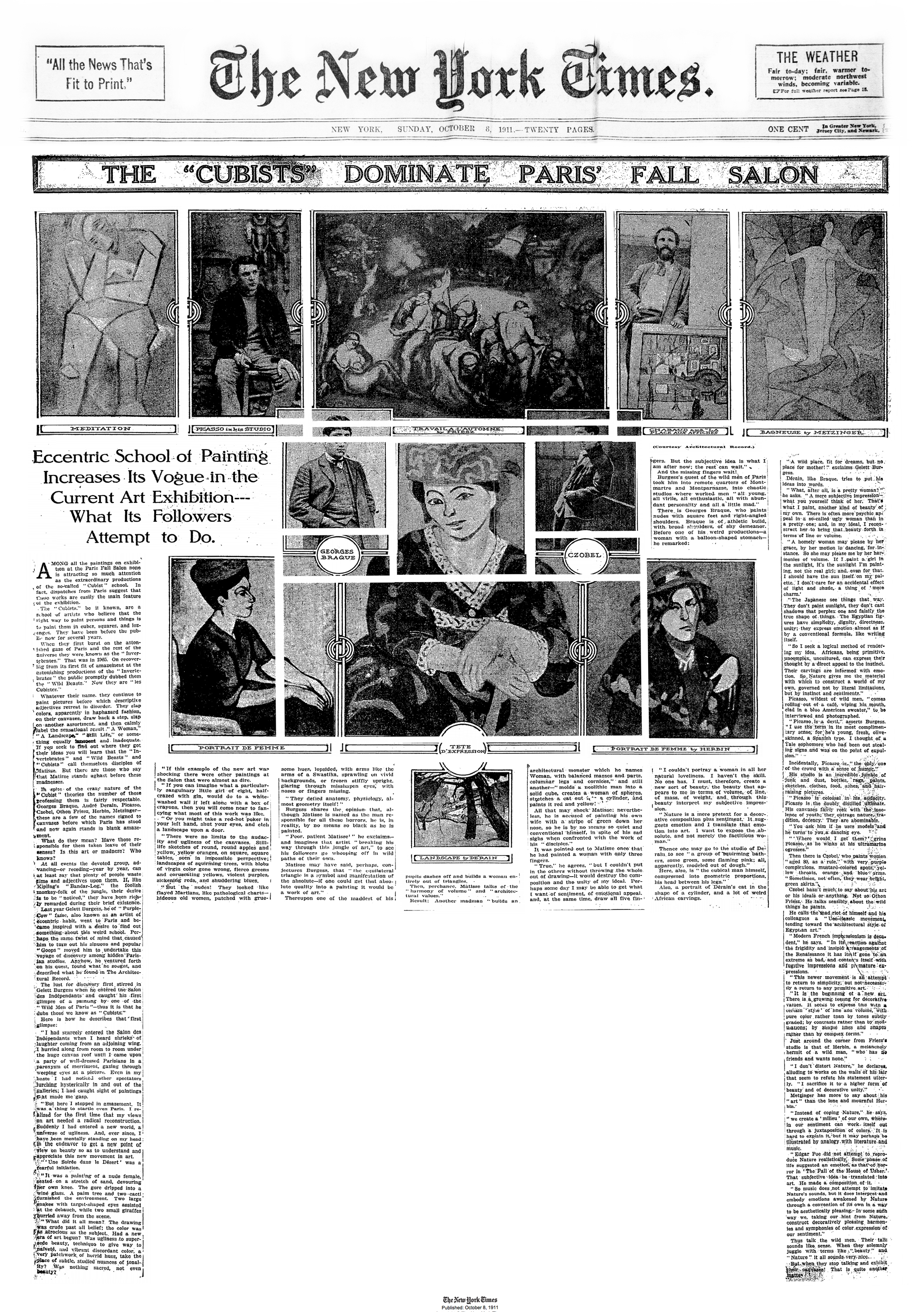
The "Cubists" Dominate Paris' Fall Salon, The New York Times, 8 October 1911. Metzinger's Baigneuses reproduced top right

== New York Times, 1911 ==
Metzinger's Baigneuses was reproduced in the 8 October 1911 issue of The New York Times. This article was published a year after The Wild Men of Paris, and two years prior to the Armory Show, which introduced astonished Americans, accustomed to realistic art, to the experimental styles of the European avant garde, including Fauvism, Cubism, and Futurism. The 1911 New York Times article, a review of the 1911 Salon d'Automne, portrayed works by Picasso, Matisse, Derain, Metzinger and others dated before 1909; not exhibited at the 1911 Salon. The article is titled: "The 'Cubists' Dominate Paris' Fall Salon" and subtitled, "Eccentric School of Painting Increases Its Vogue in the Current Art Exhibition - What Its Followers Attempt to Do."

"Among all the paintings on exhibition at the Paris Fall Salon none is attracting so much attention as the extraordinary productions of the so-called "Cubist" school. In fact, dispatches from Paris suggest that these works are easily the main feature of the exhibition. [...]

In spite of the crazy nature of the "Cubist" theories the number of those professing them is fairly respectable. Georges Braque, André Derain, Picasso, Czobel, Othon Friesz, Herbin, Metzinger—these are a few of the names signed to canvases before which Paris has stood and now again stands in blank amazement.

What do they mean? Have those responsible for them taken leave of their senses? Is it art or madness? Who knows?"

== Proto-Cubism ==
According to Metzinger, in his Cubism was Born, published years later, Cubism had been born out of the "need not for an intellectual art but for an art that would be something other than a systematic absurdity"; the idiocies of reproducing or copying nature in trompe-l'œil on a surface that is rigorously flat. With this type of illusion other artist of his generation such as Gleizes and Picasso wanted nothing to do. "Quite clearly" Metzinger notes, "nature and the painting make up two different worlds which have nothing in common ..." Already, in 1906, "it could be said that a good portrait led one to think about the painter not the model".

In his Le Cubisme était Né: Souvernirs, Metzinger writes:

As for Picasso ... the tradition he came from had prepared him better than ours for a problem to do with structure. And Berthe Weil was right when she treated those who compared him/confused him with, a Steinlen or a Lautrec as idiots. He had already rejected them in their own century, a century we had no intention of prolonging. Whether or not the Universe was endowed with another dimension, art was going to move into a different field.

The illusion had been maintained up to 1906 or 1907 through the negligence of those whose job it was to clear away the rubbish, but the break was achieved in 1908. No-one would again dare to look at a Puvis de Chavannes or read Balzac. No-one, I mean, among those who walked above the Moulin Rouge, which they would never even have thought of entering.

Metzinger continues:

I had measured the difference that separated art prior to 1900 from the art which I felt was being born. I knew that all instruction was at an end. The age of personal expression had finally begun. The value of an artist was no longer to be judged by the finish of his execution, or by the analogies his work suggested with such-and-such an archetype. It would be judged – exclusively – by what distinguished this artist from all the others. The age of the master and pupil was finally over; I could see about me only a handful of creators and whole colonies of monkeys. (Jean Metzinger, Cubism was Born)

From his Montmartre studio on the rue Lamarck to Picasso's Bateau Lavoir studio on the rue Ravignan, writes Metzinger, "the attempt [prétention] to imitate an orb on a vertical plane, or to indicate by a horizontal straight line the circular hole of a vase placed at the height of the eyes was considered as the artifice of an illusionistic trickery that belonged to another age."

I wanted an art that was faithful to itself and would have nothing to do with the business of creating illusions. I dreamed of painting glasses from which no-one would ever think of drinking, beaches that would be quite unsuitable for bathing, nudes who would be definitively chaste. I wanted an art which in the first place would appear as a representation of the impossible. (Metzinger)

It was the search for beauty that had attracted Metzinger to the abstract. Beauty depends not only on geometrical forms or simplified colors, but plainly beauty as it exists in itself. It wasn't just the simple result of a reductive approach to the elements of all the parts. It wasn't either just a dialectic view of everything that led him just as simply to treat each object as opposed to the other, and therefore thoroughly distinct. The blurring of differences was against the entire tenor of the whole.

The narrative of Metzinger outlined by his Bathers schematic geometric arrangements was the result of an abstracting process not solely based on "axiomatics". These axiomatic abstractions, however, by themselves contain no assertions as to the reality that can be experienced, not in a logical sense deduced from experience, but free inventions of the human mind, abstractions, construed by mathematical means. With works such as Bathers had emerged a growing accent on the power of the mind to create for itself, a growing spirit of abstraction, of invention, fabrication.

Metzinger's Bathers emerges as emblematic of proto-Cubism’s ambition: to dismantle the illusionistic scaffolding of painting in favor of an architecture of form, built from autonomous color planes and spatial ambiguities.

As one would expect, Metzinger’s concept of painting was both more sophisticated and perceptive than Cézanne, but fundamentally the shape of the misunderstandings that were to follow Cubism were the same as Cézanne's, and so too were the implications. Metzinger had seen painting as rooted in the experience of nature: four-dimensional and geometric. He stressed this heavily, and at the same time brought out the flatness and dislocations of Cézanne’s transformations of nature—with the conceptual aspect of multiple perspectives and non-Euclidean spacetime. The importance of Cubism, he accepted, was to emphasize the idea that everything visible (objects) and invisible (consciousness) has an n-dimensional geometric basis (an idea he associated with ‘construct an infinite number of different spaces for the use of painters’).

Nearly conscious in someone like Michelangelo, or Paolo Uccello, quite intuitive in painters such as Ingres, or Corot, it works on the basis of numbers which belong to the painting itself, not to whatever it represents. (Metzinger)

My conviction was justified: art, that which lasts, is based on mathematics.

== Related works ==
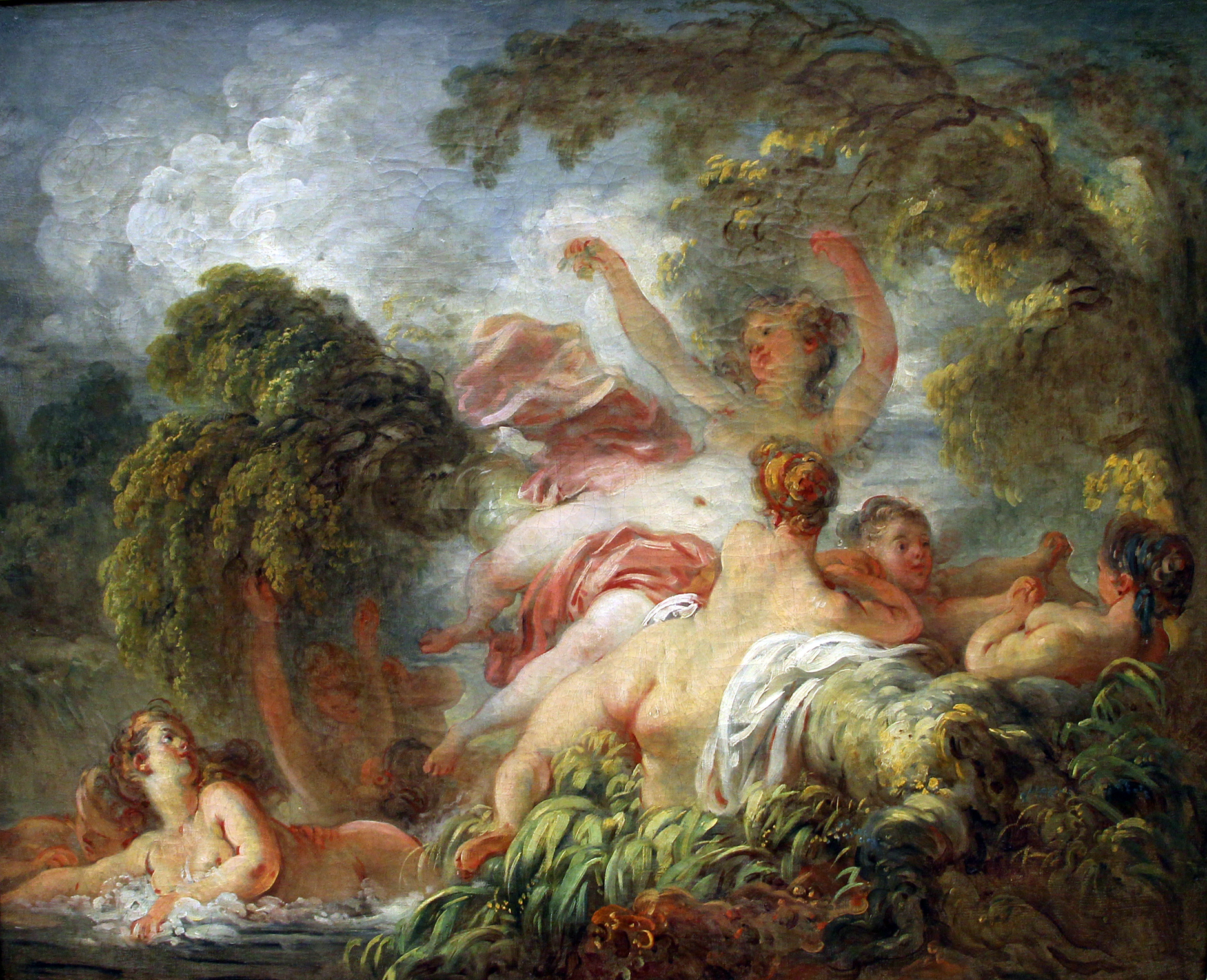
Jean-Honoré Fragonard, 1765, The Bathers, oil on canvas, 64 x 80 cm (25.2 x 31.5 in), The Louvre, Paris

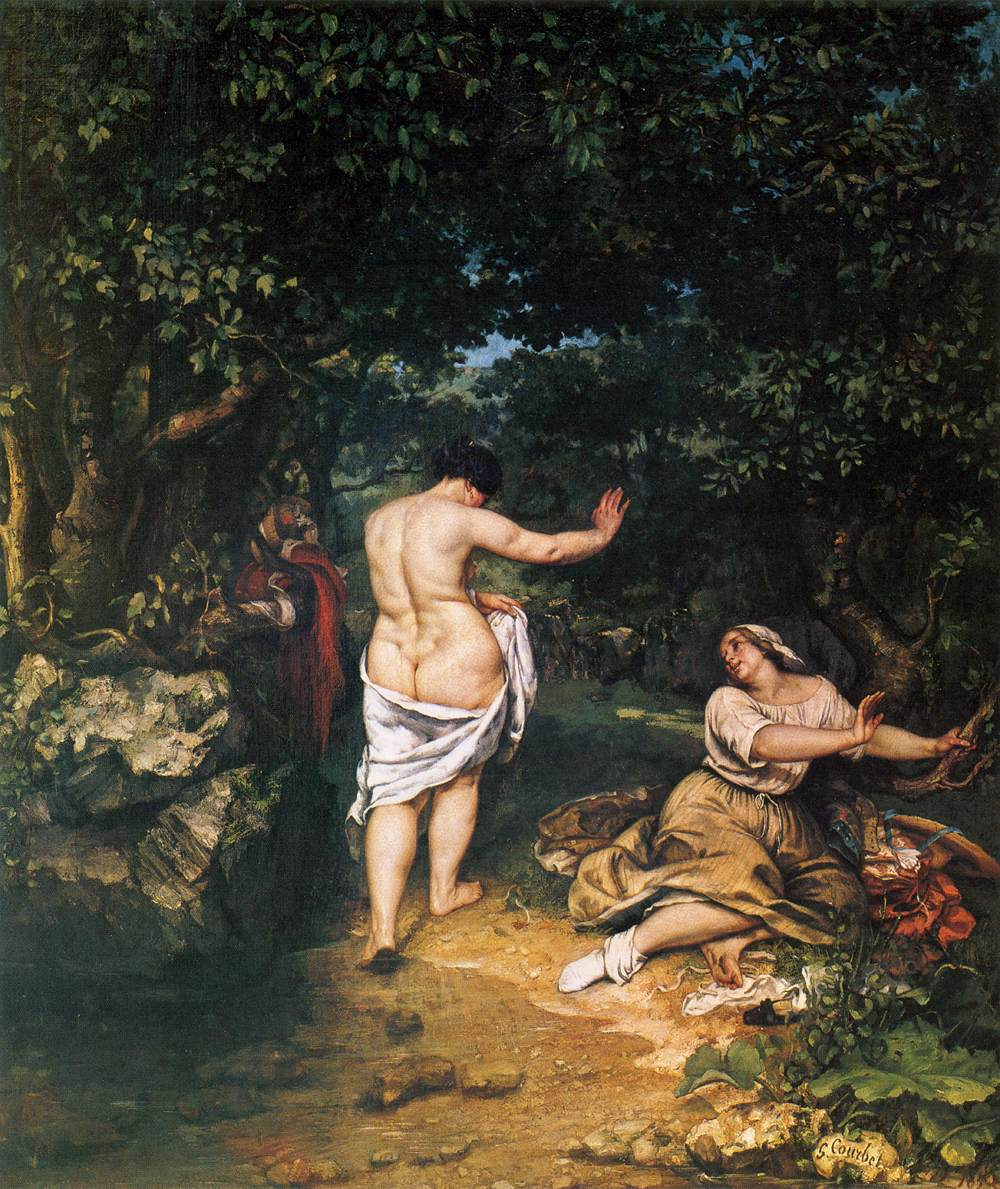
Gustave Courbet, 1853, The Bathers, oil on canvas, 227 x 193 cm (89.4 x 76 in), Musée Fabre, Montpellier

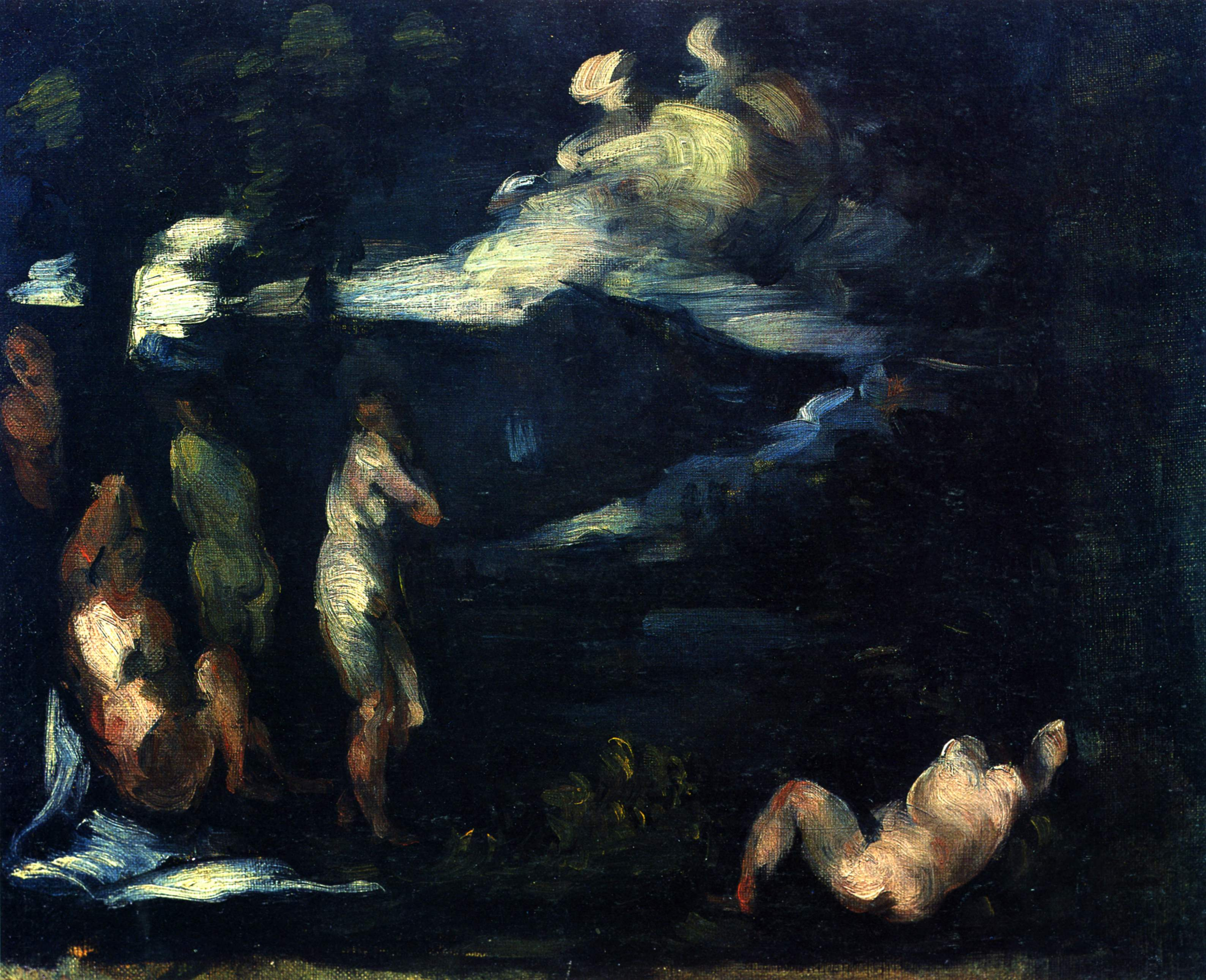
Paul Cézanne, c. 1870, Bathers, oil on canvas, 33 x 40 cm, Private collection

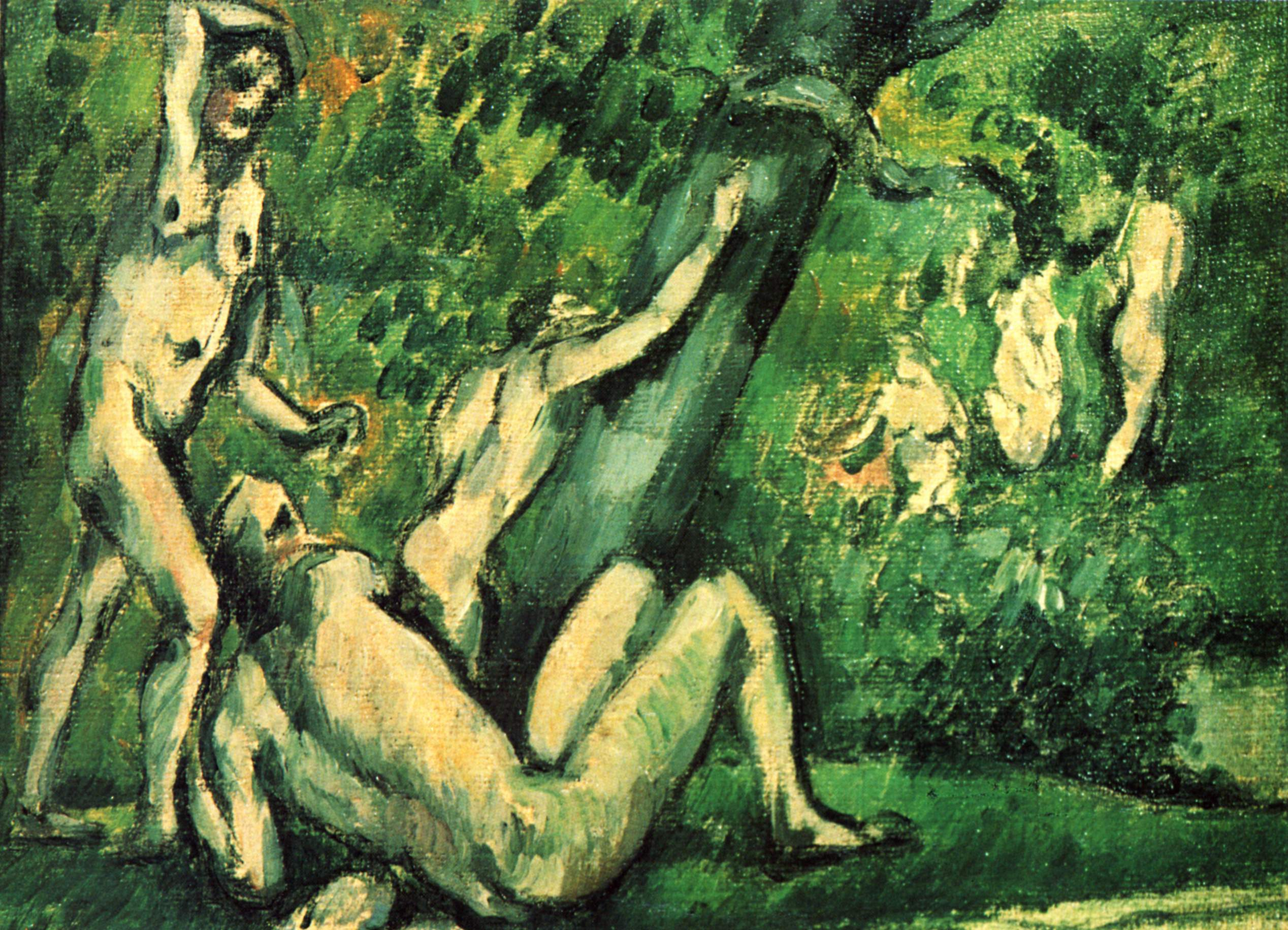
Paul Cézanne 1876–77, Bathers, oil on canvas, 15 x 19 cm, Private collection

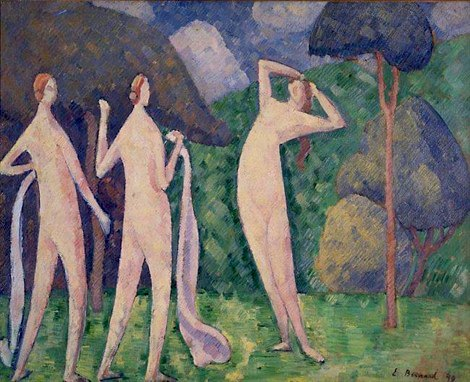
Émile Bernard, 1890, Three Bathers

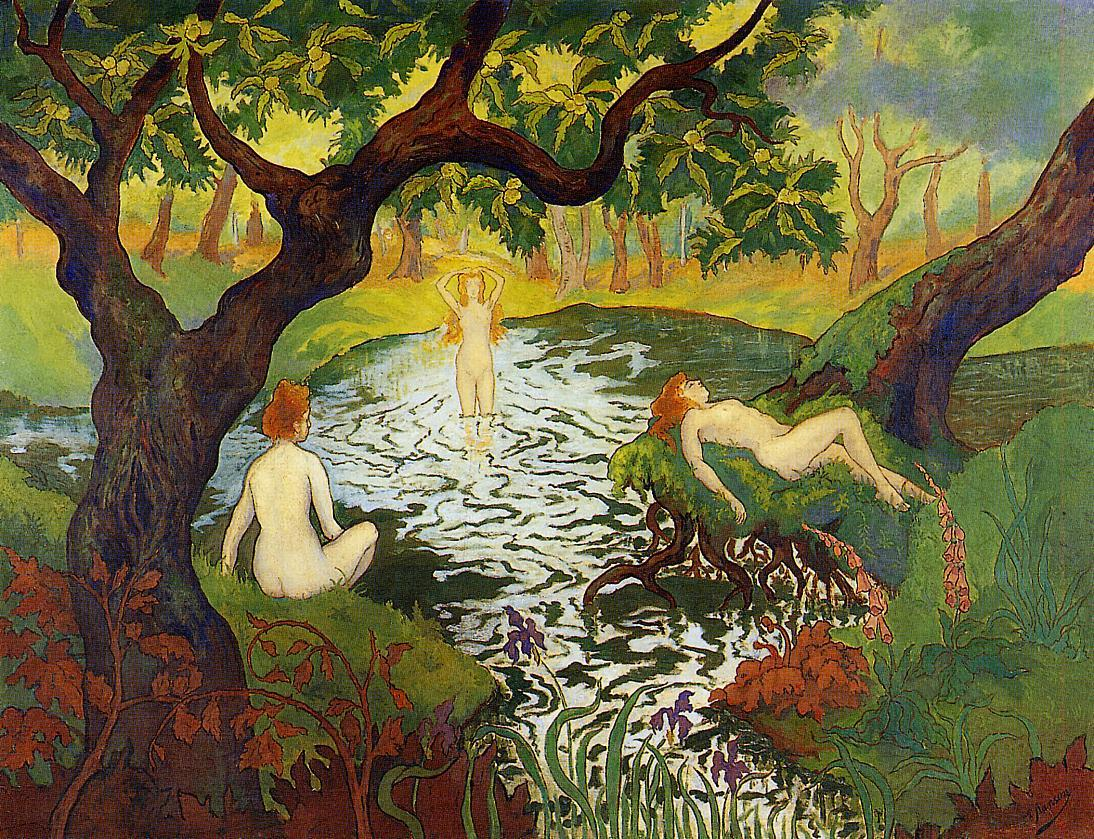
Paul Ranson, 1890, Three Bathers among the Irises

Paul Gauguin, 1892, By the Sea (Fatata te miti), 67.9 × 91.5 cm (26.7 × 36 in), National Gallery of Art, Washington, D.C.

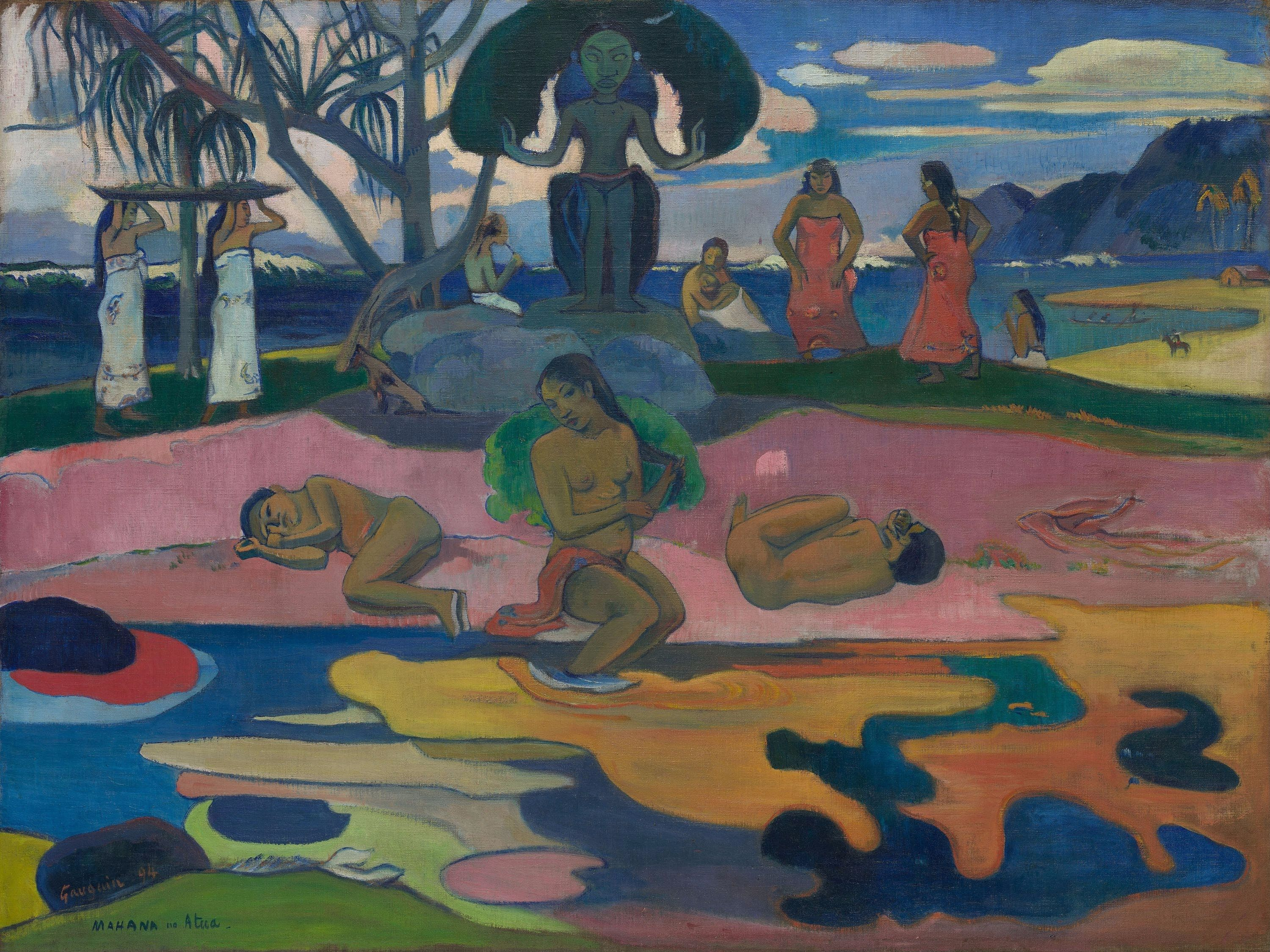
Paul Gauguin, 1894, Day of the Gods (Mahana no Atua, Te mahana nō te Atua), oil on canvas, 66 × 87 cm (26 × 34.3 in), Art Institute of Chicago

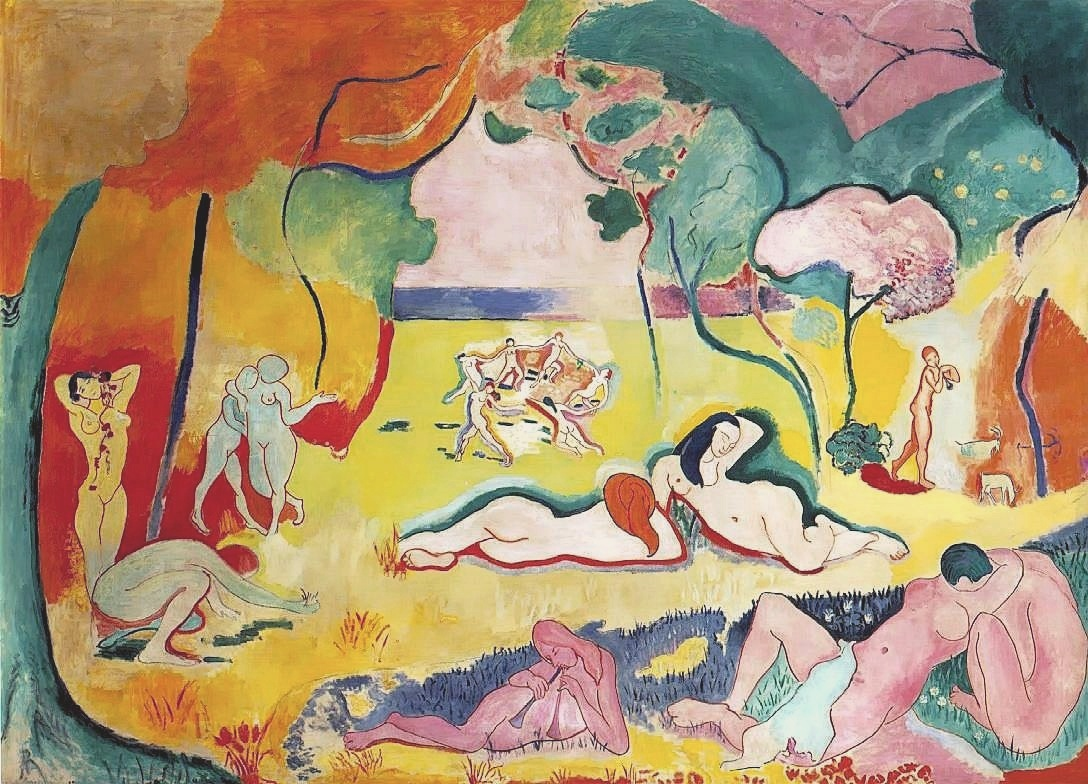
Henri Matisse, 1905–06, Le bonheur de vivre, oil on canvas, 175 x 241 cm, Barnes Foundation

== See also ==
- List of works by Jean Metzinger
