= Jouffret (surname) =

Jouffret is a French surname. Notable people with the surname include:

- Esprit Jouffret (1837–1904), French artillery officer, actuary and mathematician
- Jacques Jouffret, French cinematographer
- Louis Jouffret (born 1995), French rugby league player
