= Primitivism =

Art movement

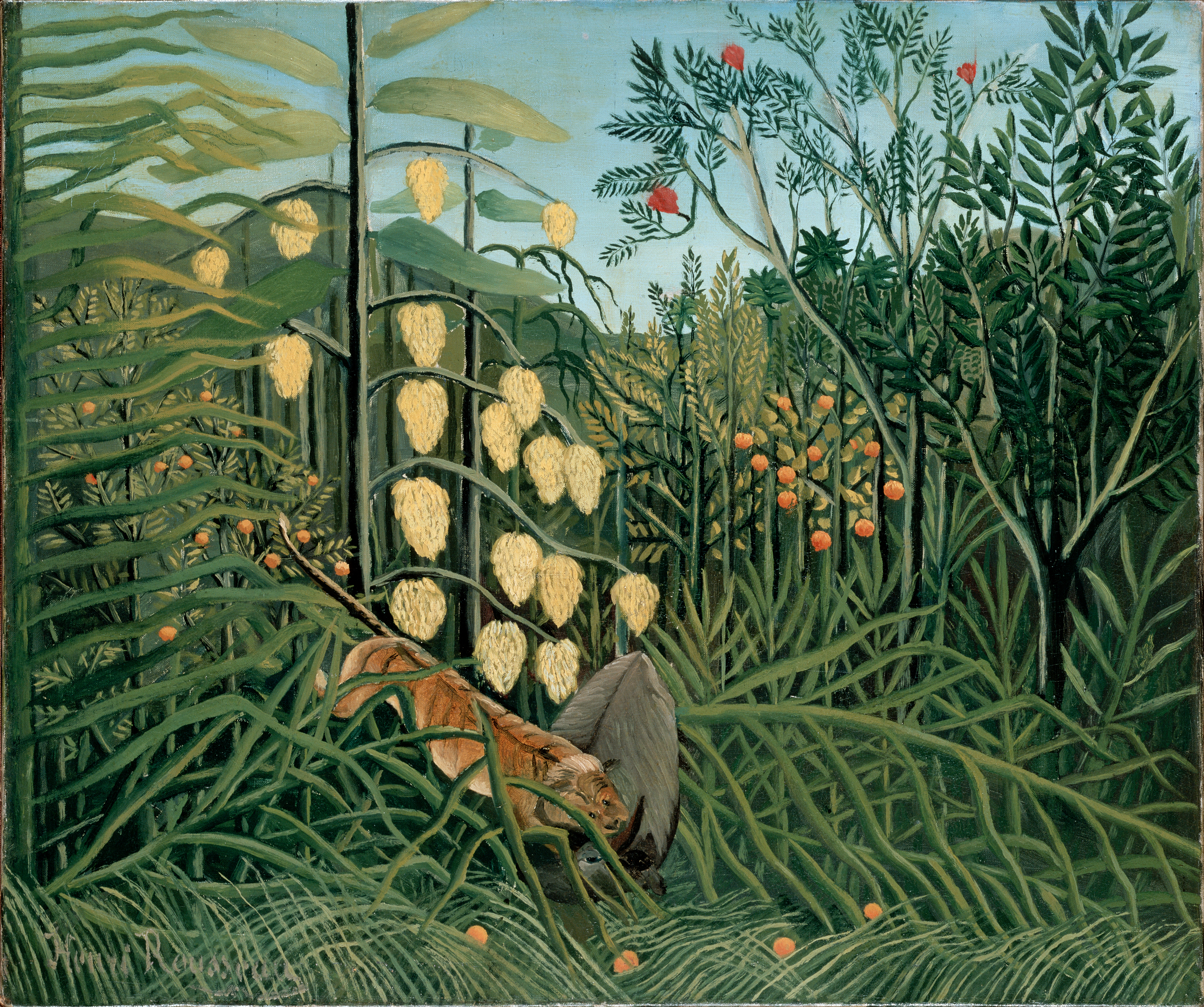
In a Tropical Forest Combat of a Tiger and a Buffalo (1908–1909), by Henri Rousseau

In the arts of the Western world, Primitivism is a mode of aesthetic idealization that means to recreate the experience of the primitive time, place, and person, either by emulation or by re-creation. In Western philosophy, Primitivism proposes that the people of a primitive society possess a morality and an ethics that are superior to the urban value system of civilized people.

In European art, the aesthetics of primitivism included techniques, motifs, and styles copied from the arts of Asian, African, and Australasian peoples perceived as primitive in relation to the urban civilization of Western Europe. In that light, the painter Paul Gauguin's inclusion of Tahitian imagery to his oil paintings was a characteristic borrowing of technique, motif, and style that was important for the development of Modern art (1860s–1970s) in the late 19th century. As a genre of Western art, Primitivism reproduced and perpetuated racist stereotypes, such as the "noble savage", with which colonialists justified white colonial rule over the non-white other in Asia, Africa, and Australasia.

Moreover, the term primitivism also identifies the techniques, motifs, and styles of painting that predominated representational painting before the emergence of the Avant-garde; and also identifies the styles of naïve art and of folk art produced by amateur artists, such as Henri Rousseau, who painted for personal pleasure.

== Philosophy ==
Primitivism is a utopian style of art that means to represent the physical world of nature and humanity's original state of nature with two styles: (i) chronological primitivism and (ii) cultural primitivism. In Europe, chronological primitivism proposes the moral superiority of a primitive way of life represented by the myth of a golden age of pre-societal harmony with nature, as depicted in the Pastoral genres of European representational art and poetry.

Notable examples of European cultural primitivism are the music of Igor Stravinsky, the Tahitian paintings of Paul Gauguin, and the African period artworks of Pablo Picasso. Stravinsky's The Rite of Spring (1913) is primitivist program music about the subject of Paganism, specifically the rite of human sacrifice in pre-Christian Russia. Foregoing the aesthetic and technical restraints of Western musical composition, in The Rite of Spring the composer employs harsh consonance and dissonance and loud, repetitive rhythms as a mode of Dionysian spontaneity in musical modernism. The critic Malcolm Cook said that "with its folk-music motifs and the infamous 1913 Paris riot securing its avant-garde credentials, Stravinsky's The Rite of Spring engaged in Primitivism in both form and practice" while remaining within the technical praxes of Western classical music. The primitivism movement is not just limited to Europe. Australia’s John Antill is known for his major primitive work Corroboree. According to Campbell, Corroboree holds significance for broader discussions of musical primitivism, as much of the musicological discourse in classical music often assumes certain musical gestures inherently signify primitivism or blends primitivism into the broader concept of musical exoticism. In contrast, Corroboree highlights representational primitivism by linking the ballet's prominent musical elements to historical ideas from the 18th to 20th centuries about the earliest phases of human musical evolution.

17th century

During the Age of Enlightenment, intellectuals rhetorically used the idealization of indigenous peoples as political criticism of European culture; however, as part of the Quarrel of the Ancients and the Moderns, the Italian intellectual Giambattista Vico said that the lives of primitive non-Europeans were more attuned to nature's aesthetic inspirations for poetry than the arts of civilized, modern man. From that perspective, Vico compared the artistic merits of the epic poetry of Homer and of the Bible against modern literature written in vernacular language.

18th century

In the Prolegomena to Homer (1795), the scholar Friedrich August Wolf identified the language of Homer's poetry and the language of The Bible as examples of folk art communicated and transmitted by oral tradition. Later, the ideas of Vico and Wolf were developed at the beginning of the 19th century by Johann Gottfried Herder; nevertheless, although influential in literature, the ideas of Vico and Wolf slightly influenced the visual arts.

19th century

The emergence of historicism — judging and evaluating different eras according to their historical context and criteria — resulted in new schools of visual art dedicated to historical fidelity of setting and costume, such as the art of Neoclassicism and the Romantic art of the Nazarene movement in Germany who were inspired by the primitive school of Italian devotional paintings, i.e. before Raphael and the discovery of oil painting.

Whereas academic painting (after Raphael) used dark glazes, idealized forms, and suppression of detail, the artists of the Nazarene movement used clear outlines, bright colors, and much detail. The artistic styles of the Nazarene movement were similar to the artistic styles of the Pre-Raphaelites, who were inspired by the critical writings of John Ruskin, who admired the painters before Raphael (e.g. Sandro Botticelli) and recommended that artists paint outdoors.

In the mid-19th century, the photographic camera and non-Euclidean geometry changed the visual arts; photography impelled the development of artistic Realism and non-Euclidean geometry voided the mathematic absolutes of Euclidean geometry, and so challenged the conventional perspective of Renaissance art by suggesting the existence of multiple worlds in which things are different from the human world.

== Modernist Primitivism ==
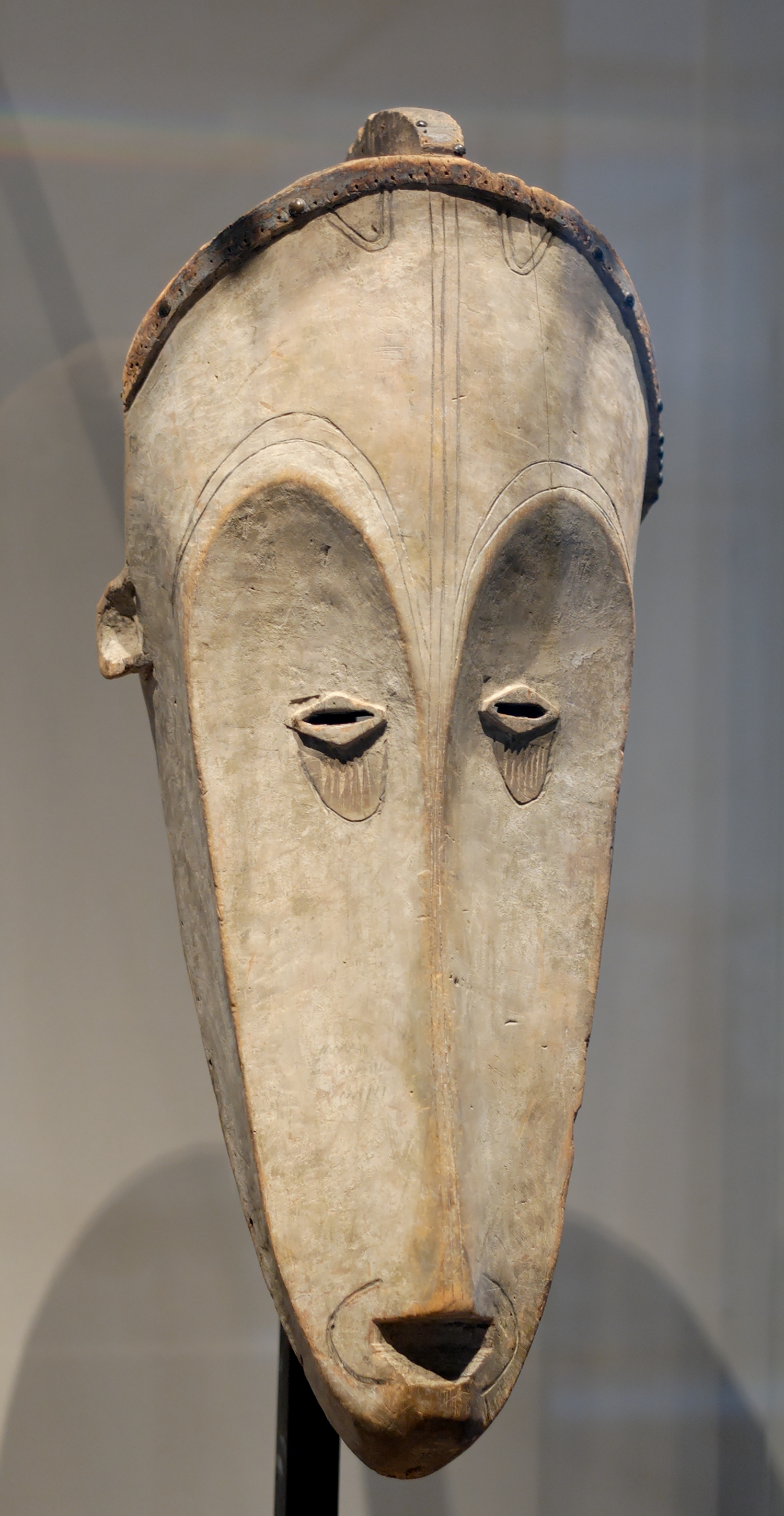
The stylistic influences of the African mask of the Fang people are noticeable in the painting Les Demoiselles d'Avignon (1907), by Pablo Picasso.

The three-hundred-year Age of Discovery (15th c.–17th c.) exposed western European explorers to the peoples and cultures of Asia and the Americas, of Africa and Australasia, but the explorers' perspective of cultural difference led to colonialism. During the Age of Enlightenment, the explorers' encounters with the non-European Other provoked philosophers to question the Mediaeval assumptions about the fixed nature of 'Man', of society, and of nature, doubted the social-class organization of society and the mental, moral, and intellectual strictures of Christianity, by comparing the civilization of Europe against the way of life of the uncivilized 'natural man' living in harmony with nature.

In the 18th century, Western artists and intellectuals participated in "the conscious search in history for a more deeply expressive, permanent human nature and cultural structure in contrast to the nascent modern realities", by studying the cultures of the primitive peoples encountered by explorers. The spoils of European colonialism included the works of art of the colonized natives, which featured primitive styles of expression and execution, especially the absence of linear perspective, a simple outline, the presence of hieroglyphs, distortions of the figure, and the meaning communicated with repeated patterns of ornamentation. The African and Australasian cultures provided artists an answer to their "white, Western, and preponderantly male quest" for the ideal of the primitive, "whose very condition of desirability resides in some form of distance and difference."

== Paul Gauguin ==
The painter Paul Gauguin departed urban Europe to reside in the French colony of Tahiti, where he adopted a primitive style of life much unlike the way of life in urban France. Gauguin's search for the primitive was a search for sexual freedom from the Christian constrictions of private life, evident in the paintings Spirit of the Dead Watching (1892), Parau na te Varua ino (1892), and Anna the Javanerin (1893), Te Tamari No Atua (1896) and Cruel Tales (1902).

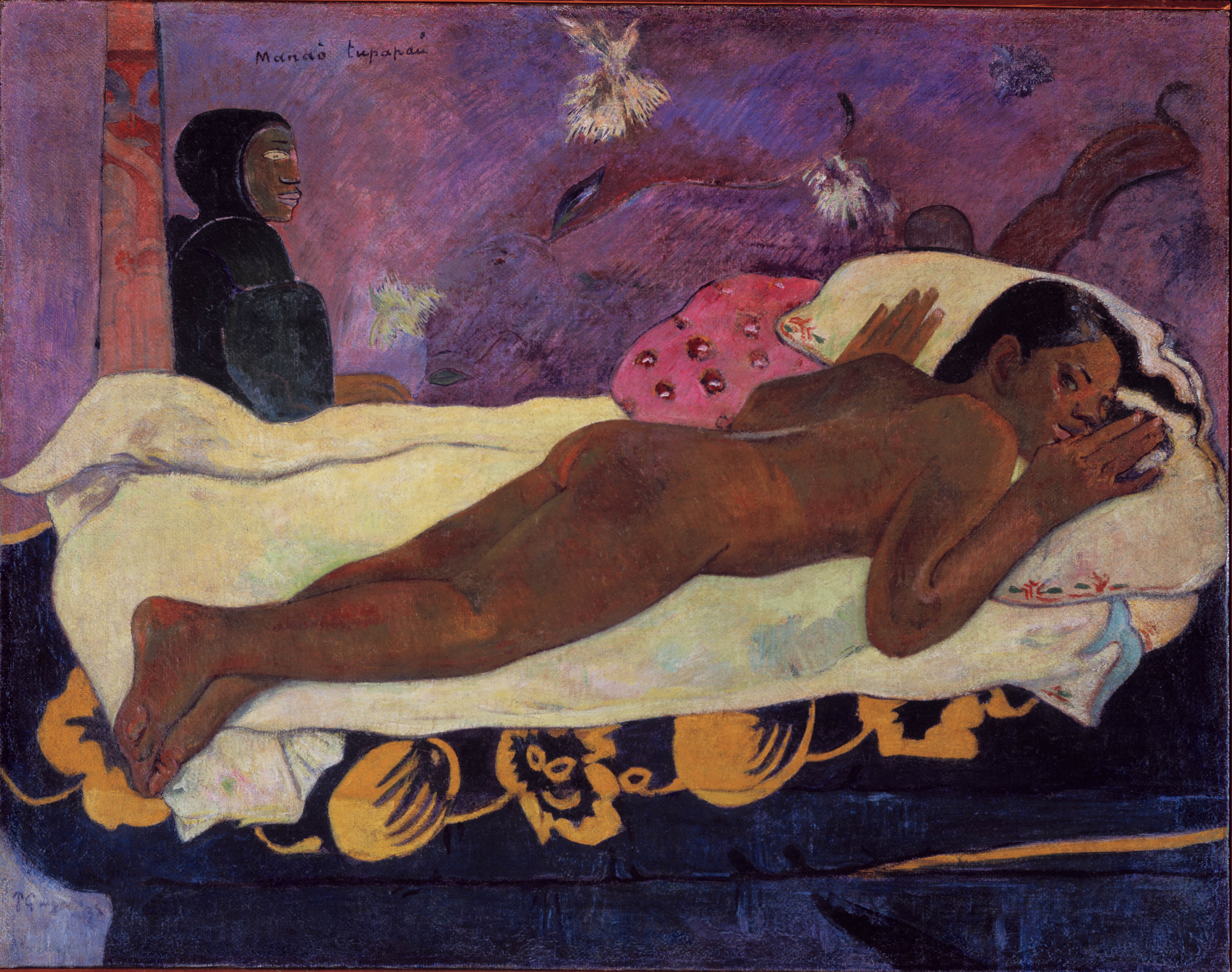
Spirit of the Dead Watching (1892), by Paul Gauguin

Gauguin's European perspective of Tahiti as a sexual utopia free of the religious sexual prohibitions is in line with the perspective of pastoral art, which idealizes rural life as better than city life. The similarities between Pastoralism and Primitivism are evident in the paintings Tahitian Pastoral (1892) and Where Do We Come From? What Are We? Where Are We Going? (1897–1898).

The artist Gauguin said that his paintings celebrated Tahitian society, and that he was defending Tahiti against French colonialism; nonetheless, from the postcolonial perspective of the 20th century, feminist art critics said that Gauguin's taking adolescent mistresses voids his claim of being an anti-colonialist. As a European man, his sexual freedom derived from the male gaze of the colonist, because Gauguin's artistic primitivism is part of the "dense interweave of racial and sexual fantasies and power, both colonial and patriarchal", which French colonialists invented about Tahiti and the Tahitians; European fantasies invented in "effort to essentialize notions of primitiveness", by Othering non-European peoples into colonial subordinates.

== Fauves and Pablo Picasso ==
In the painting Les Demoiselles d'Avignon (1907) the two figures at the right indicate the stylistic origin of Pablo Picasso's African period

In 1905–1906 period, a group of artists studied the arts from Sub-Saharan Africa and from Oceania, because of the popularity of the Gauguin paintings of Tahiti and the Tahitians. Two posthumous, retrospective exhibitions of Gauguin's works of art in Paris, one at the Salon d'Automne in 1903, and the other in 1906, influenced fauve movement artists such as Maurice de Vlaminck, André Derain and Henri Matisse, but also Pablo Picasso. In particular, Picasso studied Iberian sculpture, African sculpture, and African traditional masks, and historical works such as the Mannerist paintings of El Greco, from which aesthetic study Picasso painted Les Demoiselles d'Avignon (1907), and invented Cubism.

== Anti-colonial primitivism ==
Primitivism in art is usually regarded as a cultural phenomenon of Western art, yet the structure of primitivist idealism is in the artworks of non-Western and anti-colonial artists. The nostalgia for an idealized past when humans lived in harmony with nature is related to critiques of the negative cultural impact of Western modernity upon colonized peoples. The primitivist works of anti-colonial artists are critiques of the Western stereotypes about colonized peoples, while also yearning for the pre-colonial way of life. The processes of decolonization fuse with the reverse teleology of Primitivism to produce native works of art distinct from the primitivist artworks by Western artists, which reinforce colonial stereotypes as true.

As a type of artistic primitivism, the artworks of the Négritude movement tend to evoke nostalgia for a lost golden age. Begun in the 1930s, by francophone artists and intellectuals on both sides of the Atlantic Ocean, the Négritude movement was readily adopted throughout continental Africa and by the African diaspora. In rejection of Western rationalism and European colonialism, the Négritude artists idealized pre-colonial Africa with works of art that represent pre-colonial Africa as composed of societies that were more culturally united before the Europeans arrived to Africa.

Notable among the artists of the Négritude movement is the Cuban artist Wifredo Lam, who was associated with Picasso and the surrealists in Paris, in the 1930s. On returning to Cuba in 1941, Lam was emboldened to create dynamic tableaux that integrated human beings, animals, and Nature. In The Jungle (1943), Lam's polymorphism creates a fantastical jungle scene featuring African motifs among the stalks of sugar cane to represent the connection between the neo-African idealism of Négritude and the history of plantation slavery for the production of table sugar.

== Neo-primitivism ==
Neo-primitivism was a Russian art movement that took its name from the 31-page pamphlet Neo-primitivizm, by Aleksandr Shevchenko (1913). It is considered a type of avant-garde movement and is proposed as a new style of modern painting which fuses elements of Cézanne, Cubism, and Futurism with traditional Russian 'folk art' conventions and motifs, notably the Russian icon and the lubok.

Neo-primitivism replaced the symbolist art of the Blue Rose movement. The nascent movement was embraced due to its predecessor's tendency to look back so that it passed its creative zenith. A conceptualization of neo-primitivism describes it as anti-primitivist Primitivism since it questions the primitivist's Eurocentric universalism. This view presents neo-primitivism as a contemporary version that repudiates previous primitivist discourses. Some characteristics of neo-primitivist art include the use of bold colors, original designs, and expressiveness. These are demonstrated in the works of Paul Gauguin, which feature vivid hues and flat forms instead of a three-dimensional perspective. Igor Stravinsky was another neo-primitivist known for his children's pieces, which were based on Russian folklore. Several neo-primitivist artists were also previous members of the Blue Rose group.

=== Neo-primitive artists ===
Russian artists associated with Neo-primitivism include:

- Mikhail Larionov
- Natalia Goncharova
- Aleksandr Shevchenko
- Marc Chagall
- Kasimir Malevich
- Ilya Mashkov
- Pavel Filonov
- David Burliuk
- Igor Stravinsky

=== Gallery of Russian Neo-primitive artists ===
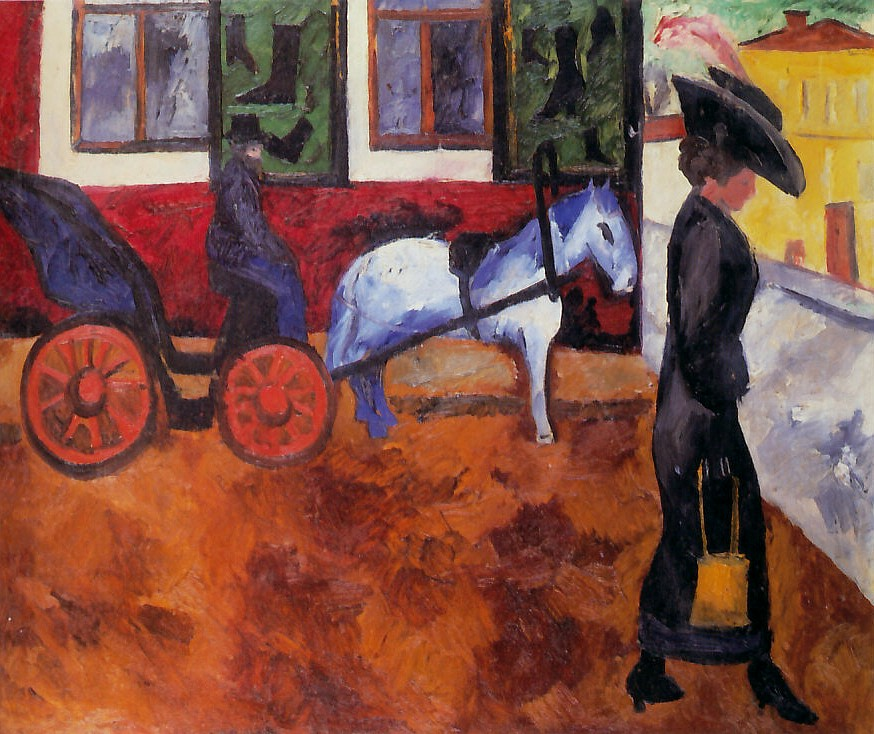
Natalia Goncharova, Street in Moscow, 1909

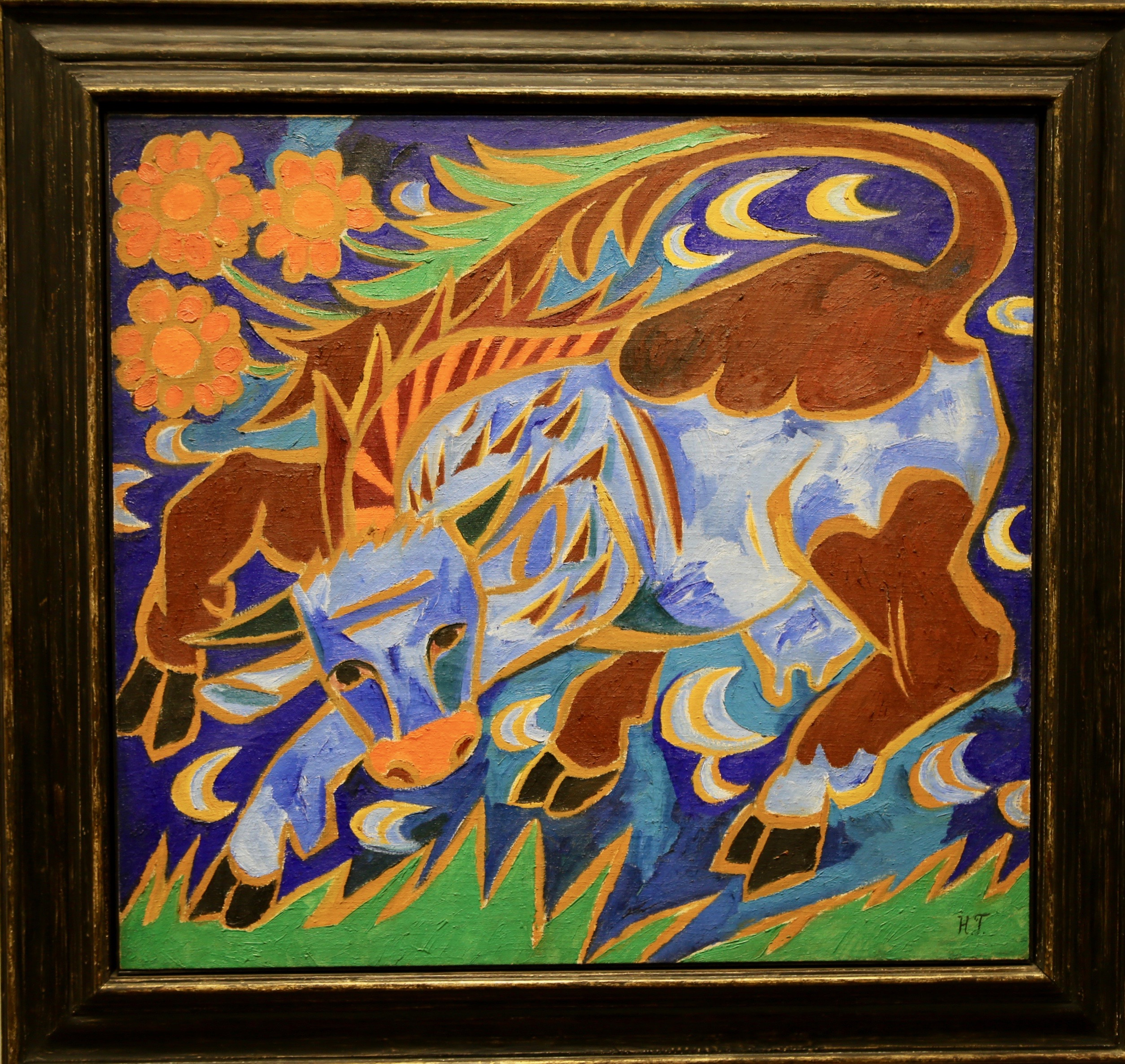
Natalia Goncharova, “Blue Cow”

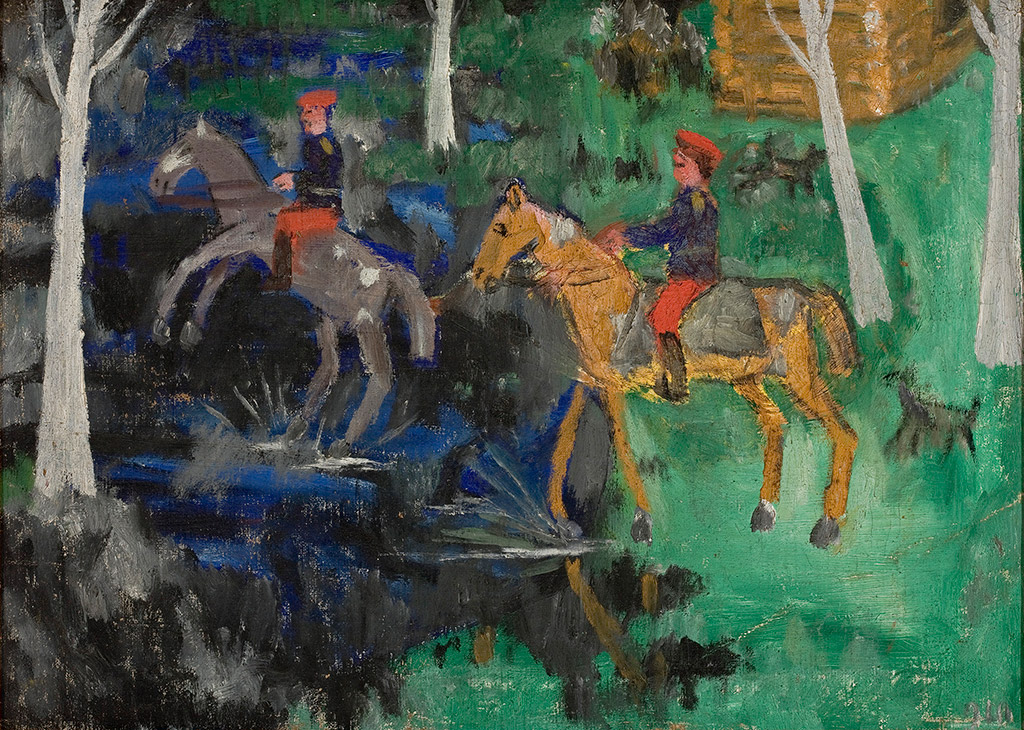
Mikhail Larionov, “Two Chevaliers”, 1910

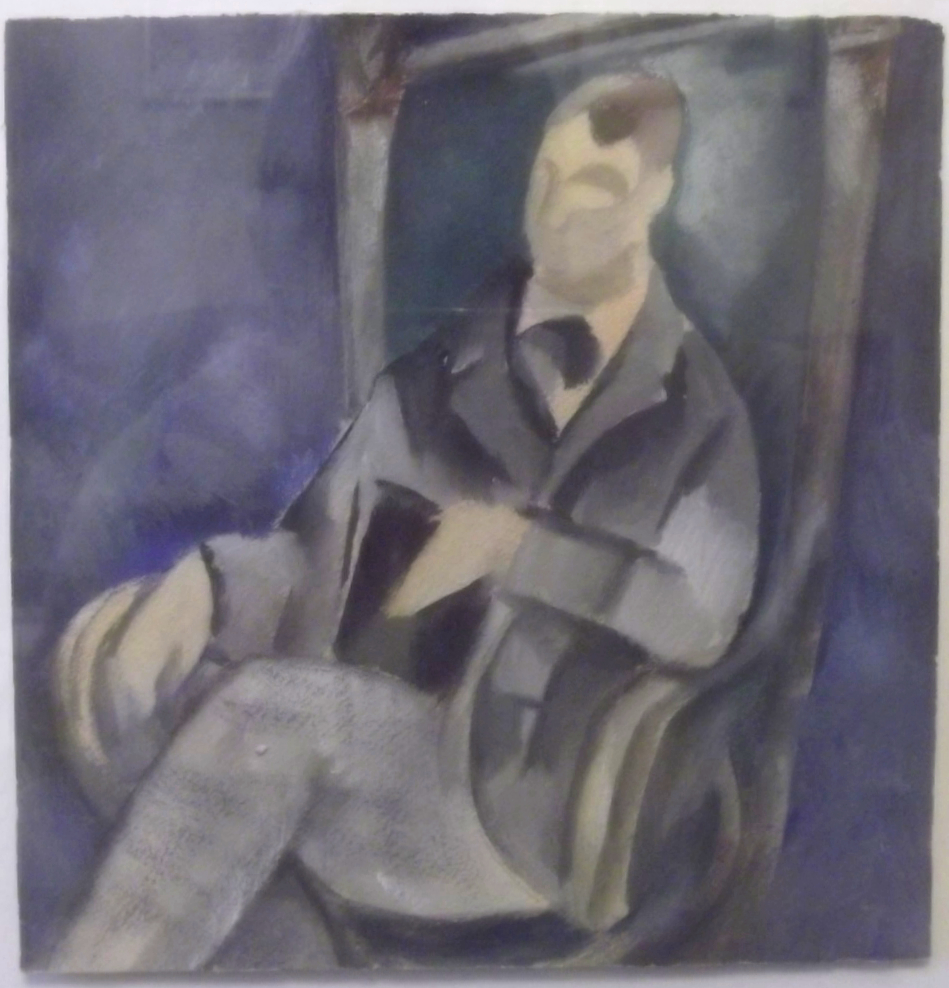
Aleksandr Shevchenko, “Portrait of Man in Chair”, 1914

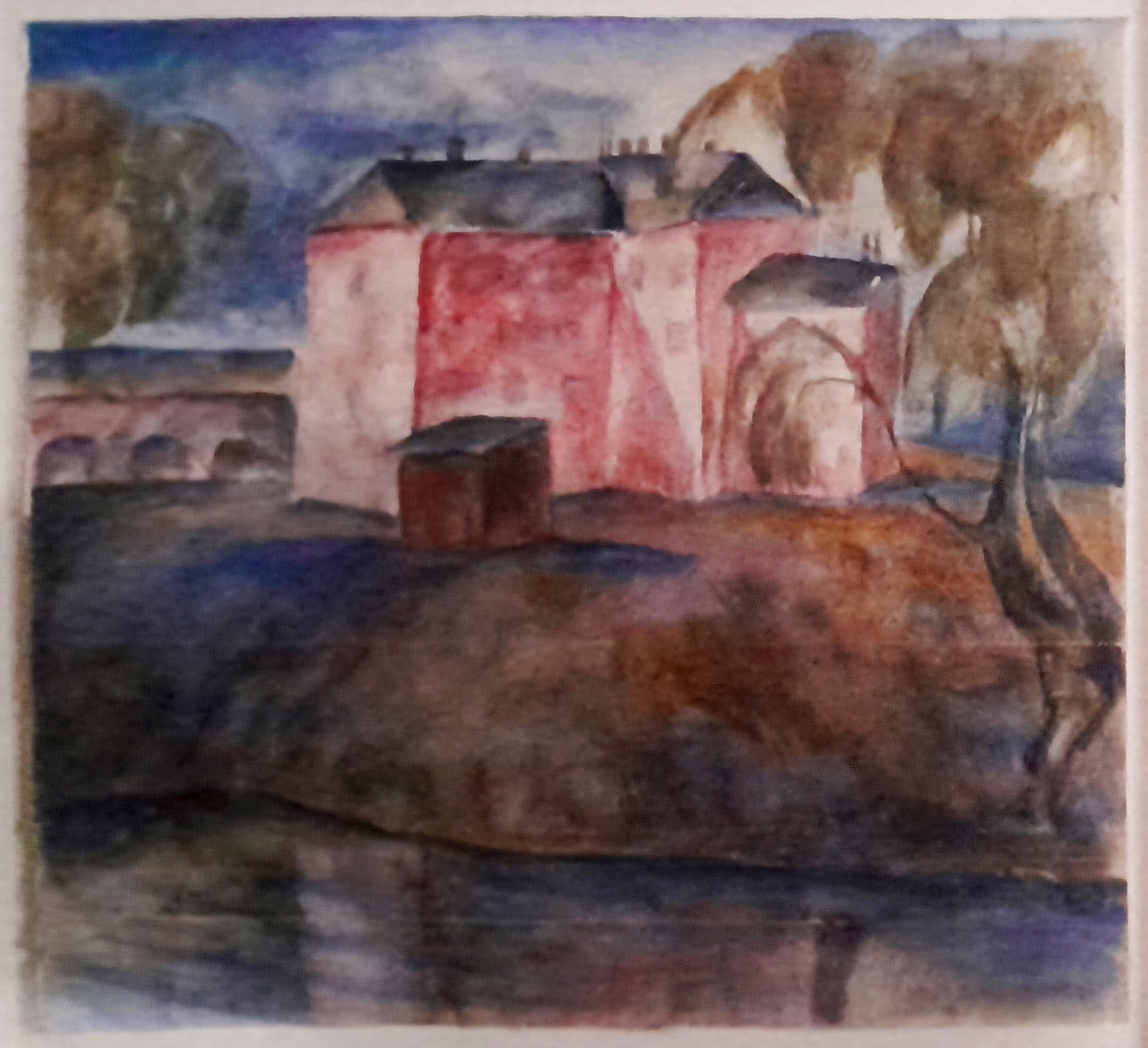
Aleksandr Shevchenko, “Red House with River”, 1911

== Museum exhibitions on primitivism in modern art ==
In November 1910, Roger Fry organized the exhibition titled Manet and the Post-Impressionists held at the Grafton Galleries in London. This exhibition showcased works by Paul Cézanne, Paul Gauguin, Henri Matisse, Édouard Manet, Pablo Picasso, and Vincent Van Gogh, among others. This exhibition was meant to showcase how French art had developed over the past three decades; however, art critics in London were shocked by what they saw. Some called Fry "mad" and "crazy" for publicly displaying such artwork in the exhibition. Fry's exhibition called attention to primitivism in modern art even if he did not intend for it to happen; leading American scholar Marianna Torgovnick to term the exhibition as the "debut" of primitivism on the London art scene.

In 1984, The Museum of Modern Art in New York had a new exhibition focusing on primitivism in modern art. Instead of pointing out the obvious issues, the exhibition celebrated the use of non-Western objects as inspiration for modern artists. The director of the exhibition, William Rubin, took Roger Fry's exhibition one step further by displaying the modern works of art juxtaposed to the non-Western objects themselves. Rubin stated, "That he was not so much interested in the pieces of 'tribal' art in themselves but instead wanted to focus on the ways in which modern artists 'discovered' this art." He was trying to show there was an 'affinity' between the two types of art. Scholar Jean-Hubert Martin argued this attitude effectively meant that the 'tribal' art objects were "given the status of not much more than footnotes or addenda to the Modernist avant-garde." Rubin's exhibition was divided into four different parts: Concepts, History, Affinities, and Contemporary Explorations. Each section is meant to serve a different purpose in showing the connections between modern art and non-Western 'art.'

In 2017, the Musée du Quai Branly – Jacques Chirac in collaboration with the Musée National Picasso – Paris, put on the exhibition Picasso Primitif. Yves Le Fur, the director, stated he wanted this exhibition to invite a dialogue between "the works of Picasso – not only the major works but also the experiments with aesthetic concepts – with those, no less rich, by non-Western artists." Picasso Primitif meant to offer a comparative view of the artist's works with those of non-Western artists. The resulting confrontation was supposed to reveal the similar issues those artists have had to address such as nudity, sexuality, impulses and loss through parallel plastic solutions.

In 2018, the Montreal Museum of Fine Arts had an exhibition titled From Africa to the Americas: Face-to-Face Picasso, Past and Present. The MMFA adapted and expanded on Picasso Primitif by bringing in 300 works and documents from the Musée du Quai Branly – Jacques Chirac and the Musée National Picasso – Paris. Nathalie Bondil saw the issues with the ways in which Yves Le Fur presented Picasso's work juxtaposed to non-Western art and objects and found a way to respond to it. The headline of this exhibition was, "A major exhibition offering a new perspective and inspiring a rereading of art history." The exhibition looked at the transformation in our view of the arts of Africa, Oceania, and the Americas from the end of the 19th century to the present day. Bondil wanted to explore the question about how ethnographic objects come to be viewed as art. She also asked, "How can a Picasso and an anonymous mask be exhibited in the same plane?"

== See also ==
- Decadence
- Escapism
- Ethnology
- Exoticism
- Folk art
- Medievalism
- Naïve art
- Orientalism
- State of nature

== Further reading on Neo-primitivism ==
- Cowell, Henry. 1933. "Towards Neo-Primitivism". Modern Music 10, no. 3 (March–April): 149–53. Reprinted in Essential Cowell: Selected writings on Music by Henry Cowell, 1921–1964, edited by Richard Carter (Dick) Higgins and Bruce McPherson, with a preface by Kyle Gann, 299–303. Kingston, NY: Documentext, 2002. ISBN 978-0-929701-63-9.
- Doherty, Allison. 1983. "Neo-Primitivism". MFA diss. Syracuse: Syracuse University.
- Floirat, Anetta. 2015a. "Chagall and Stravinsky: Parallels Between a Painter and a Musician Convergence of Interests", Academia.edu (April).
- Floirat, Anetta. 2015b. "Chagall and Stravinsky, Different Arts and Similar Solutions to Twentieth-Century Challenges". Academia.edu (April).
- Floirat, Anetta. 2016. "The Scythian Element of the Russian Primitivism, in Music and Visual arts. Based on the Work of Three Painters (Goncharova, Malevich and Roerich) and Two Composers (Stravinsky and Prokofiev)". Academia.edu.
- Garafola, Lynn. 1989. "The Making of Ballet Modernism". Dance Research Journal 20, no. 2 (Winter: Russian Issue): 23–32.
- Hicken, Adrian. 1995. "The Quest for Authenticity: Folkloric Iconography and Jewish Revivalism in Early Orphic Art of Marc Chagall (c. 1909–1914)". In Fourth International Symposium Folklore–Music–Work of Art, edited by Sonja Marinković and Mirjana Veselinović-Hofman, 47–66. Belgrade: Fakultet Muzičke Umetnosti.
- Nemirovskaâ, Izol'da Abramovna [Немировская, Изольда Абрамовна]. 2011. "Музыка для детей И.Стравинского в контексте художественной культуры рубежа XIX-ХХ веков" [Stravinsky's Music for Children and Art Culture at the Turn of the Twentieth Century]. In Вопросы музыкознания: Теория, история, методика. IV [Problems in Musicology: Theory, History, Methodology. IV], edited by Ûrij Nikolaevic Byckov [Юрий Николаевич Бычков] and Izol'da Abramovna Nemirovskaâ [Изольда Абрамовна Немировская], 37–51. Moscow: Gosudarstvennyj Institut Muzyki im. A.G. Snitke. ISBN 978-5-98079-720-1.
- Sharp, Jane Ashton. 1992. "Primitivism, 'Neoprimitivism', and the Art of Natal'ia Gonchrova, 1907–1914". Ph.D. diss. New Haven: Yale University.
