= Fatata te Miti (By the Sea) =

1892 painting by Paul Gauguin

- Artist: Paul Gauguin
- Year: 1892
- Catalogue: W 463
- Type: Oil paint on canvas
- Dimensions: 67.9 by 91.5 centimetres (26.7 in × 36.0 in)
- Location: National Gallery of Art, Washington DC

Fatata te Miti is an 1892 oil painting by French artist Paul Gauguin, located in the National Gallery of Art, in Washington, DC.

== Painting ==
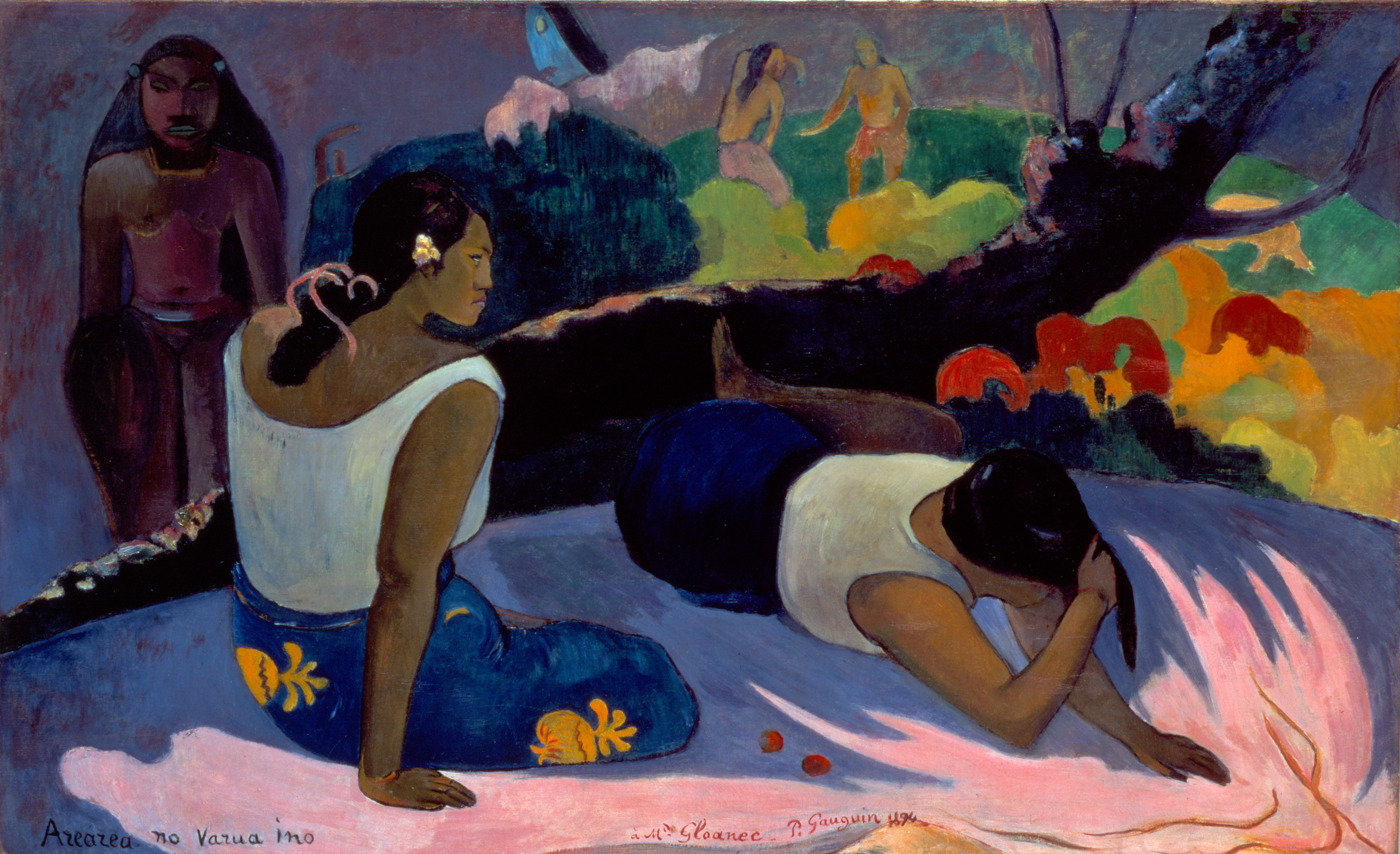
Arearea no varua ino (The Amusement of the Evil Spirit), 1894, Ny Carlsberg Glyptotek

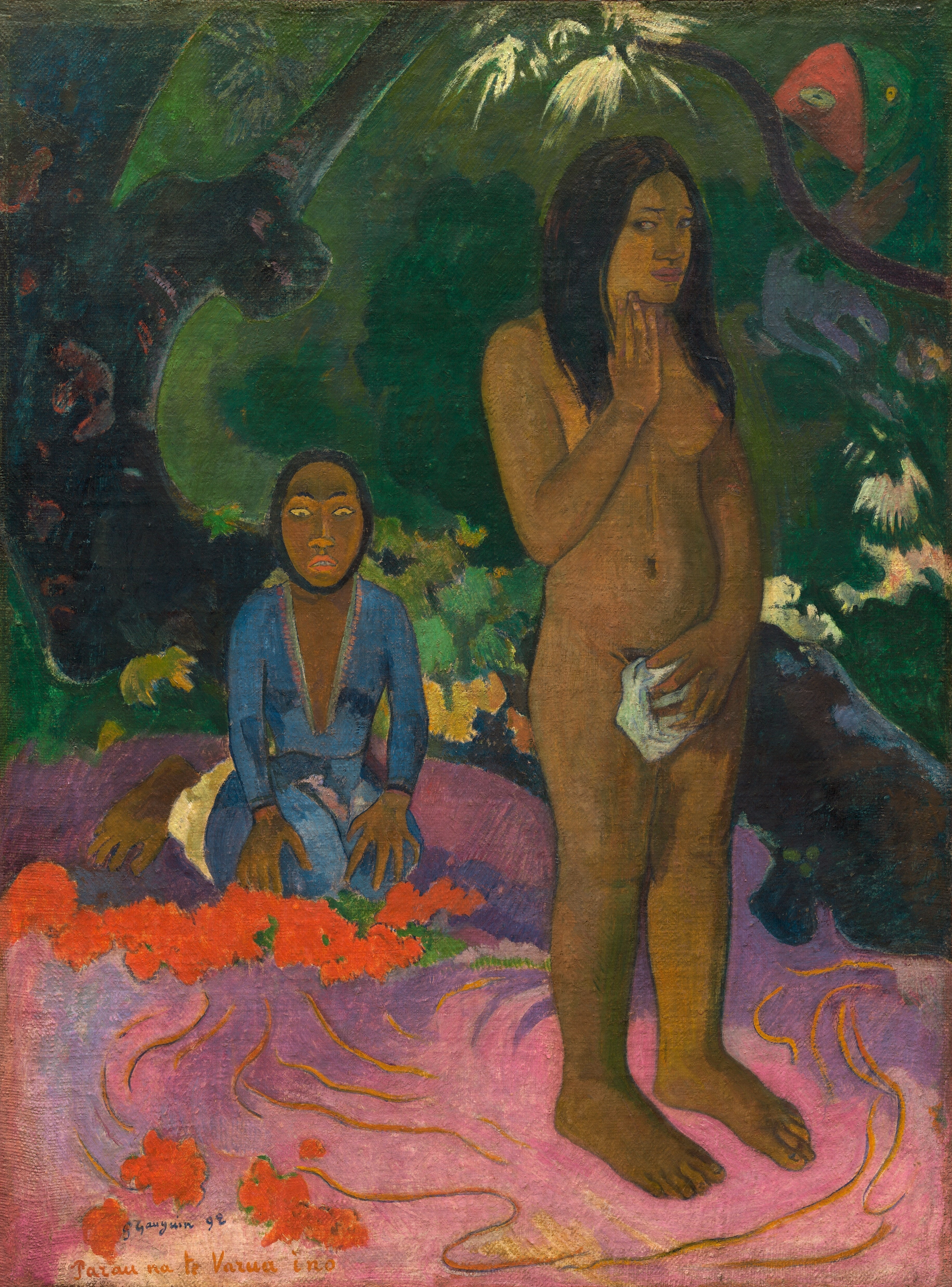
Parau na te Varua ino (Words of the Devil), 1892, National Gallery of Art Washington

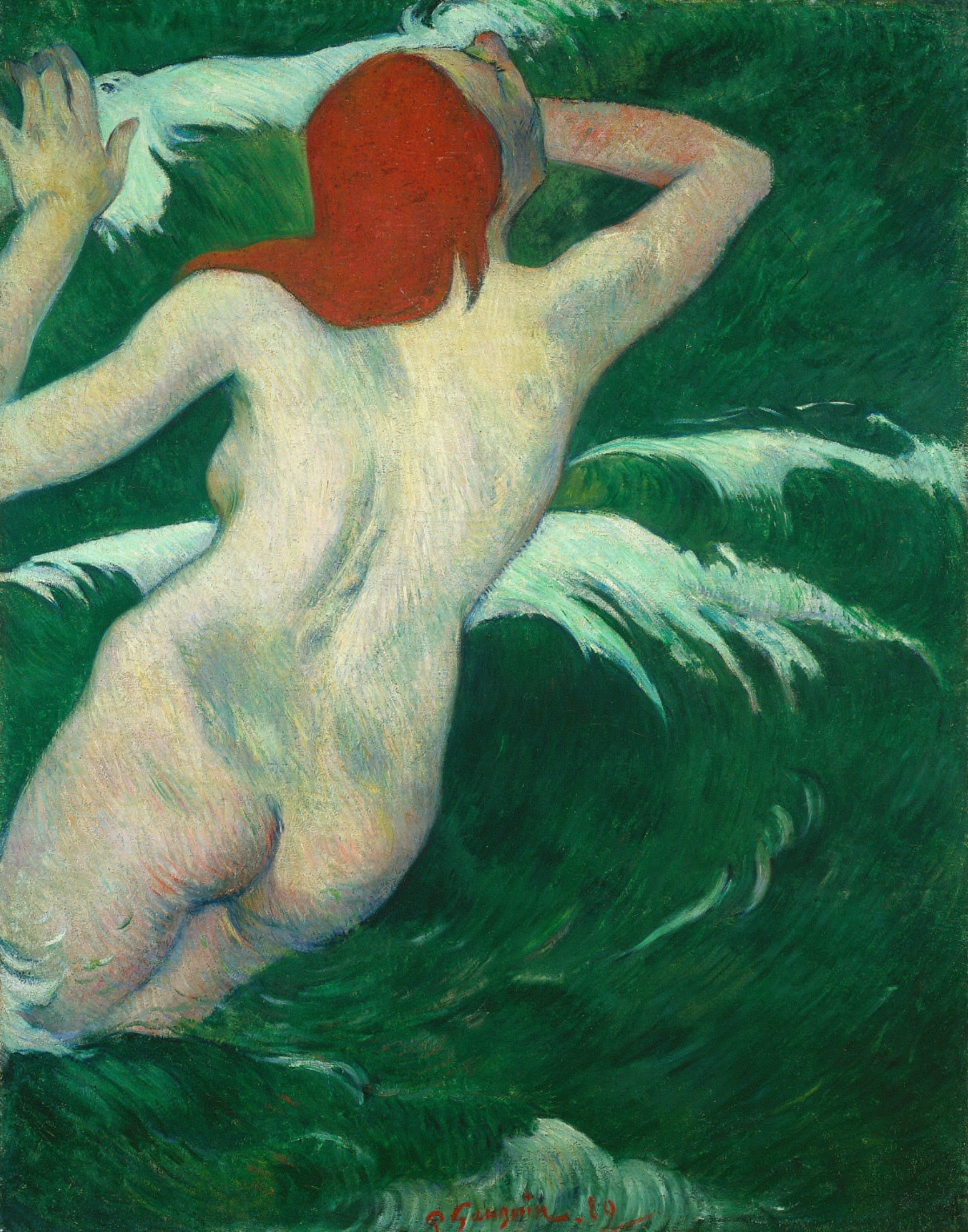
In the wave or Ondine, 1889, Cleveland Museum of Art

Gauguin painted Fatata te miti (By the Sea) in 1892 during his first trip to Tahiti. Like Vahine no te vi (Woman of the Mango) (W 449) painted at the same time, it is an example of the relatively few straightforward genre scenes that Gauguin painted immediately after setting up his studio in a native bamboo hut at Mataiea, Papeari. Nevertheless, as Nancy Mowll Mathews, Gauguin's biographer, points out, neither represents what he actually saw; the paintings transforming the mundane and ordinary into an exoticized view of the island's life. A pendant painting Arearea no varua ino (The Amusement of the Evil Spirit) (W 514), executed shortly after Gauguin had returned to Paris, appears to share the same setting and demonstrates how he moved on from simple genre painting, introducing symbolist elements. The same tree, dividing the painting into two distinct zones, can be seen in Parau na te Varua ino (Words of the Devil) (W 458).

The painting depicts two Tahitian women, seen from behind, jumping into the sea. There is a fisherman in the background, fishing with a spear. The painting epitomizes the romantic view of Tahitians made famous by Pierre Loti's Le Mariage de Loti. In that novel, Loti described his Tahitian bride's pursuits as extremely simple, "reverie, bathing, above all bathing". The women in the painting bathe naked, removing their pareos, apparently unbothered by the presence of the fisherman nearby. This is an image of the uninhibited tropical paradise Gauguin had hoped to find, although the reality was that Polynesian culture had been transformed by western missionaries and colonialism as they imposed their own values and religion on the people living in the islands.

The theme of nymphs frolicking in the waves was a tradition of the Golden Age repeatedly represented by artists such as Titian and Courbet through to Gauguin's own contemporary Degas. Gauguin was fascinated by the theme, first taking it up in 1885 with his Women Bathing (W 167). He returned to it with his 1889 Ondine (W 336), his signature painting at the Volpini Exhibition.

Gauguin uses intense tropical colors to convey sensual delight. For example, he uses pinks and purples for the sand, although in reality the beaches were a drab volcanic brown. The technique employed here of applying pure (unmixed) color in bold and flat shapes delineated by dark counters is one he developed in Brittany, dubbed cloisonnism. Eisenman remarks that in this and similar paintings, Gauguin placed jigsaw puzzles shapes of complementary and adjacent shades side by side as binaries to suggest a coloristic liminal intermediary, reflecting Gauguin's spiritual belief that binaries such as the moral and physical universe were reconcilable. To heighten the luminosity and enhance their jewellike effect, Gauguin applied a thin layer of clear wax to the surface of his early Tahitian paintings.

The painting was previously owned by Chester Dale, who left his collection to the National Gallery of Art, Washington, D.C. in 1962.

== First Tahitian period ==
Looking for a society more elemental and simple than that in France, Gauguin auctioned thirty of his paintings and used the money to travel to Tahiti. This first visit lasted from 1891 to 1893. His book Noa Noa was written in the style of a travel journal and was originally meant to provide a context for his 1893 Paris exhibition. Gauguin first used the words "Noa Noa" reporting the words the Tahitians themselves used for the scent of Tahitian women: "Téiné merahi noa noa " meaning "(now) very fragrant". The substantive Fenua ("land" or "island") is understood in the title of his book, so the correct translation is "The Fragrant Isle". Also implied is the Tahitian term for "Paradise" - Rohutu noanoa. In the event his book remained unpublished until 1901, although extracts were published in La Revue Blanche in 1897. The first European exhibition of Gauguin's work took place in March 1893 in Copenhagen, when he was able to take up the offer of a visiting sea captain and send out eight selected paintings.

Paintings from Gauguin's first Tahitian period selected for his Copenhagen exhibition

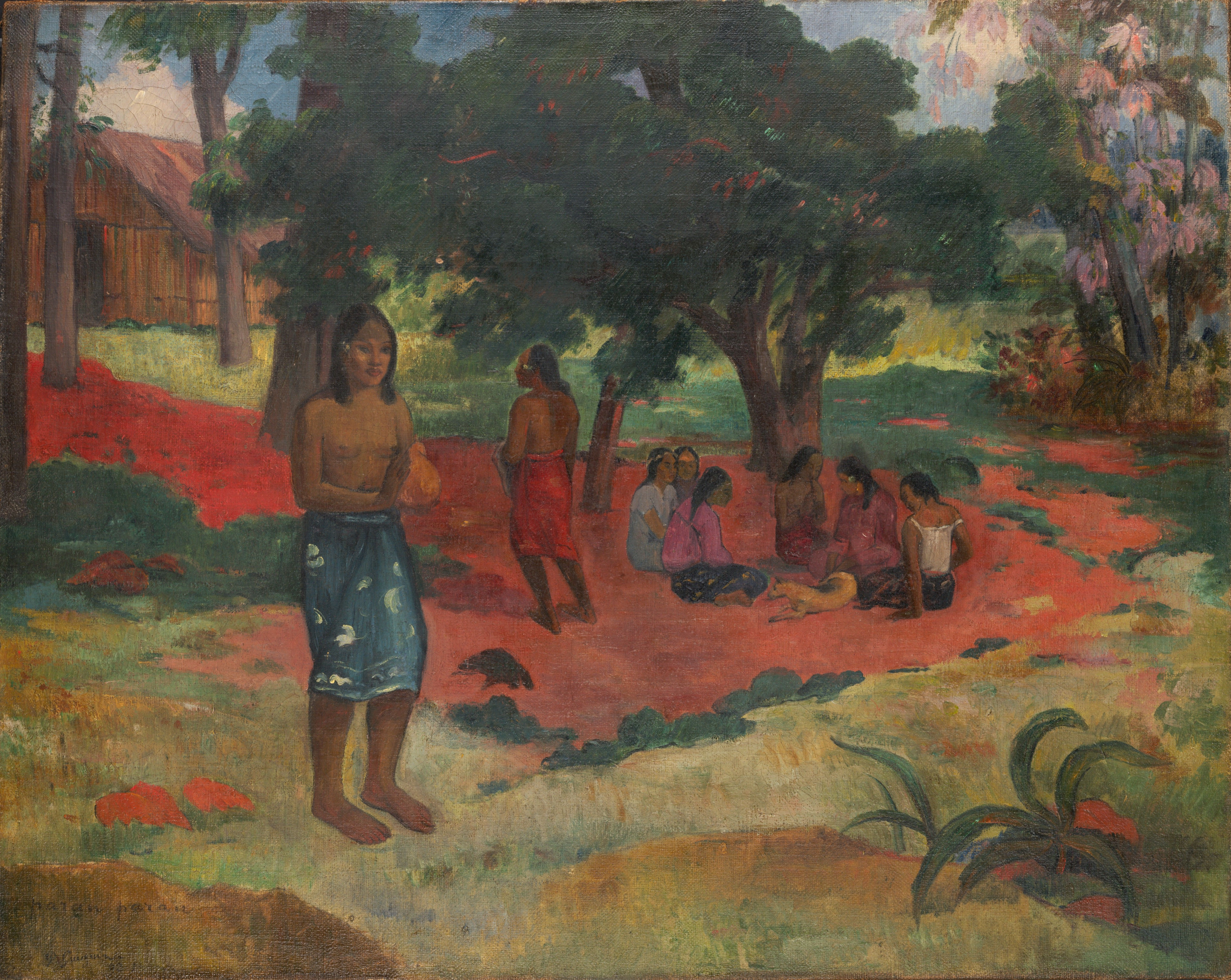

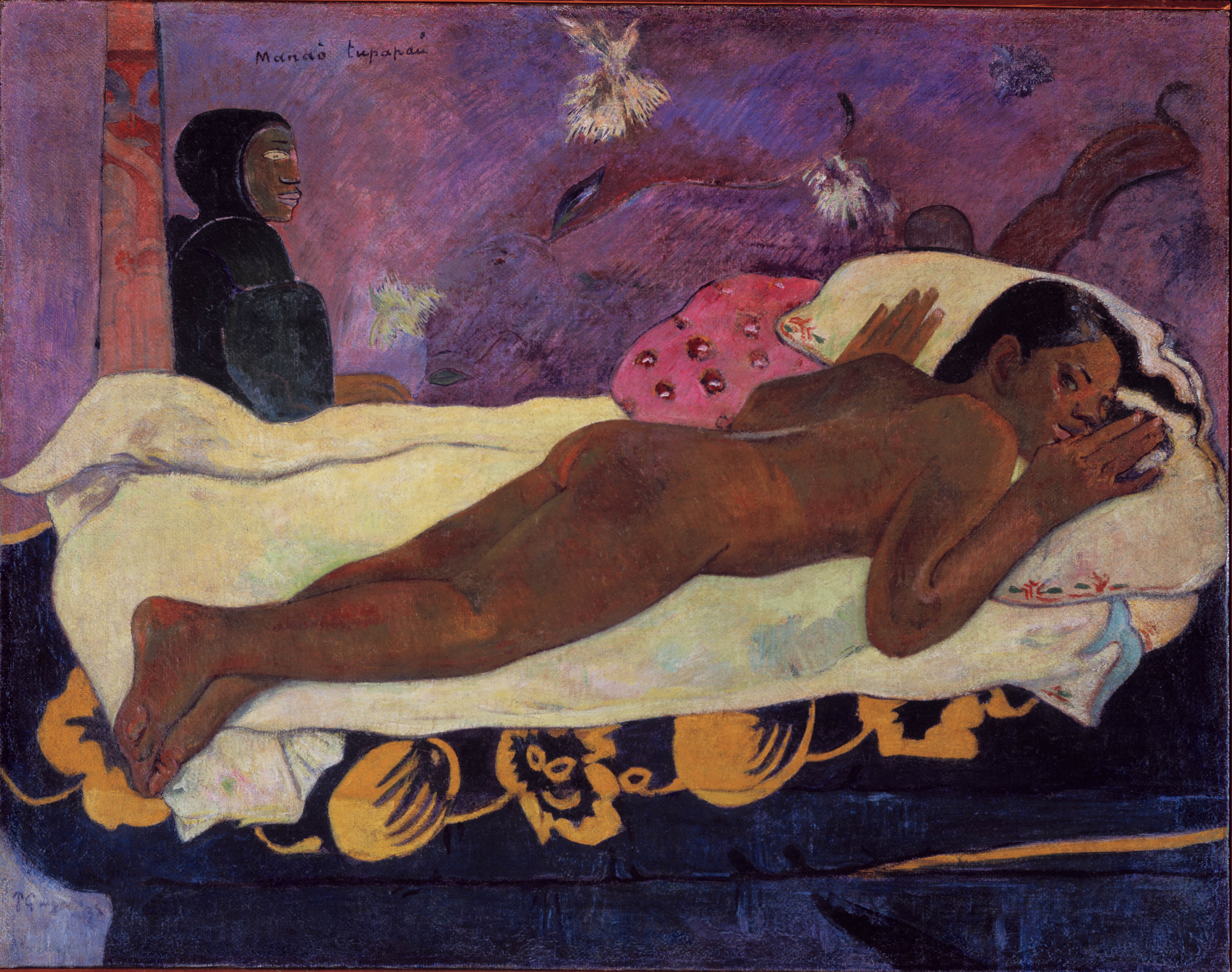

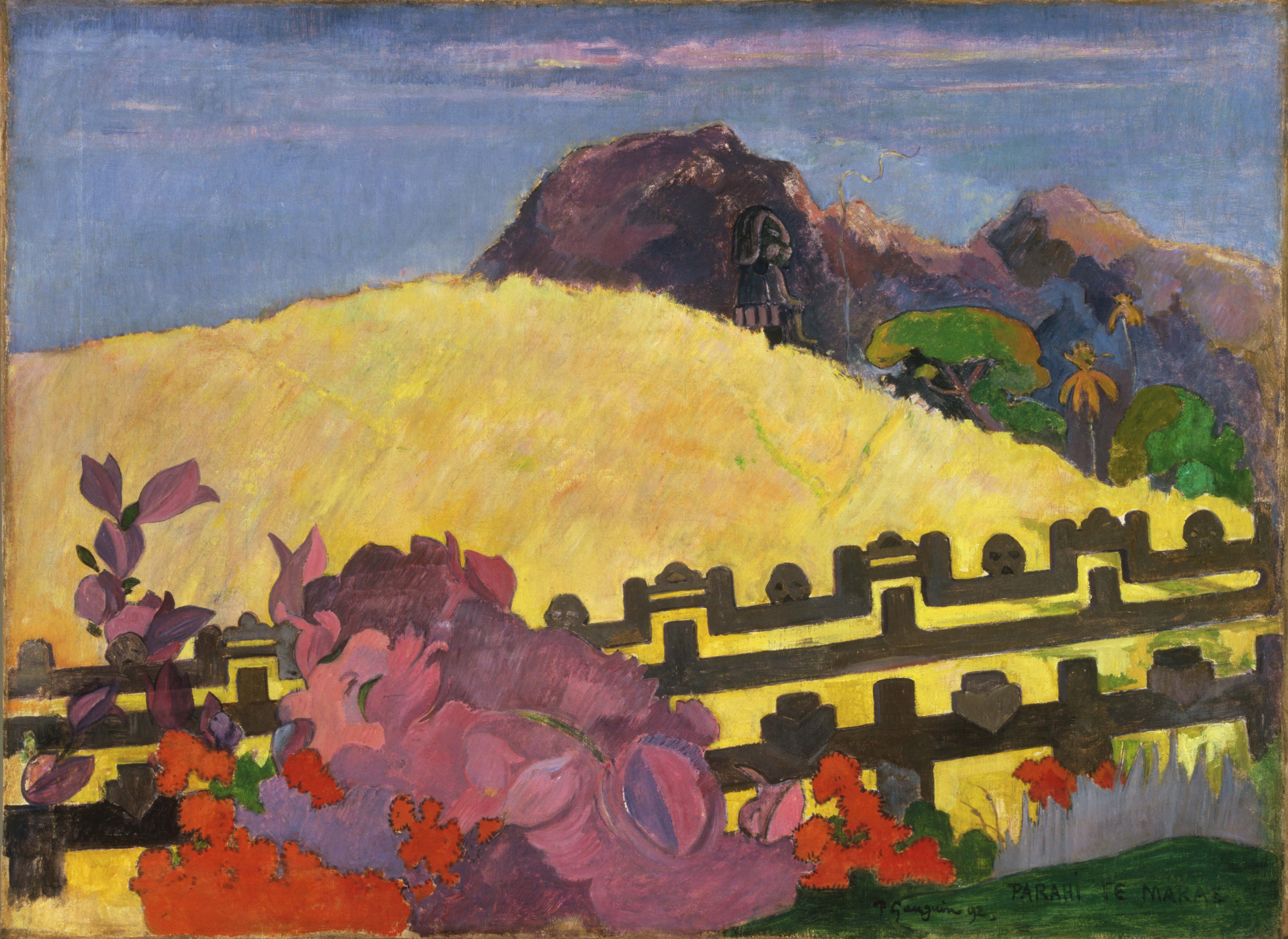

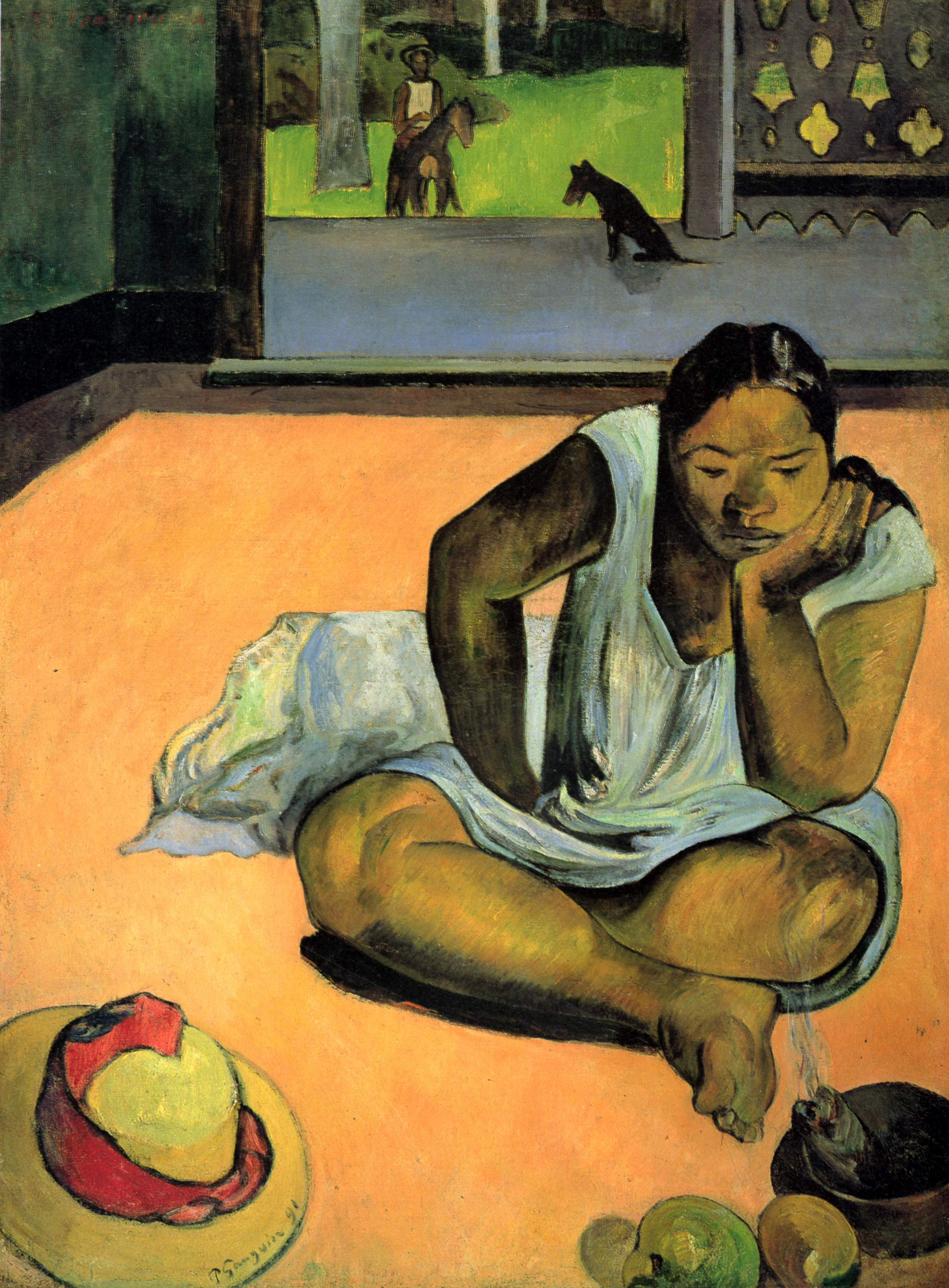

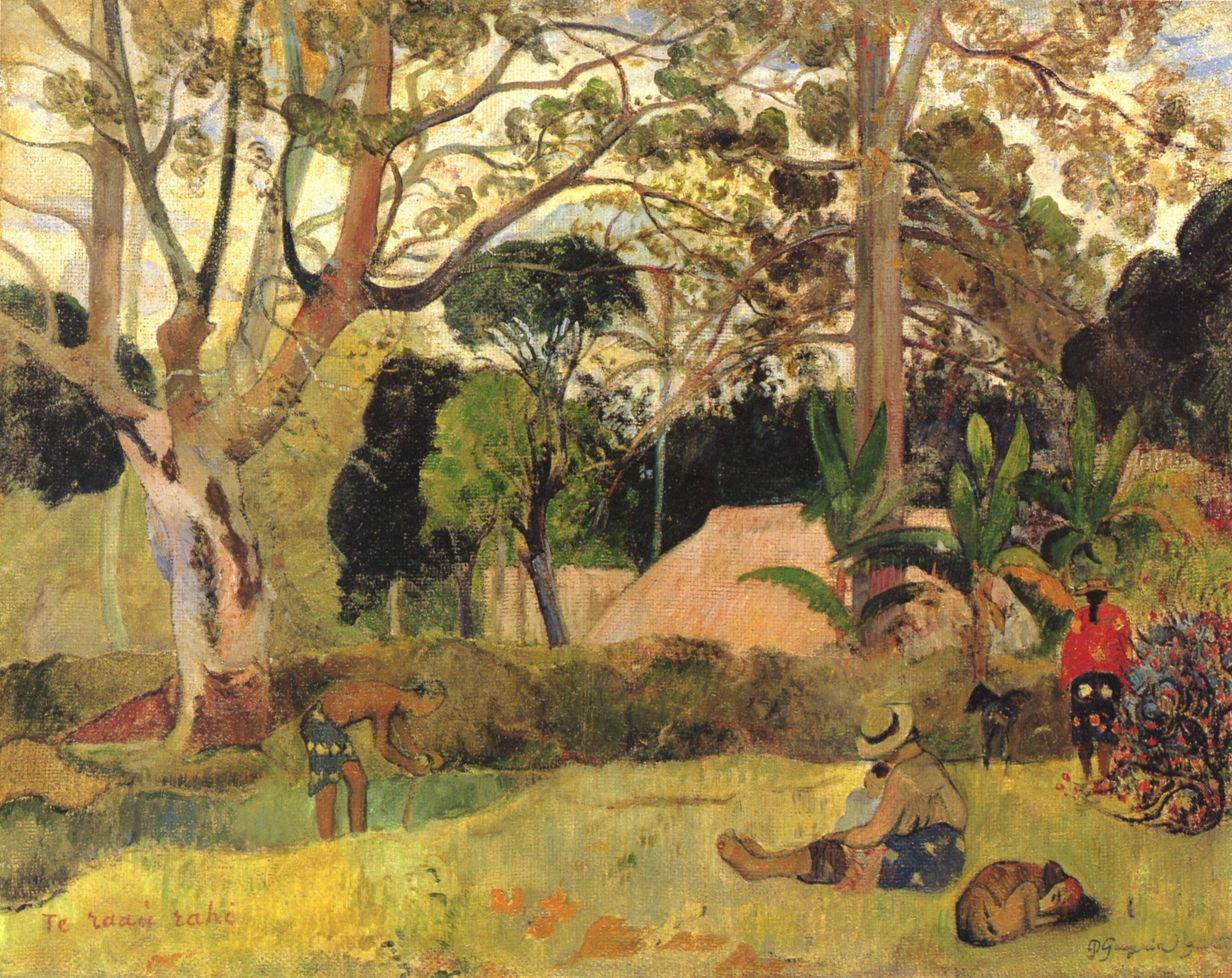

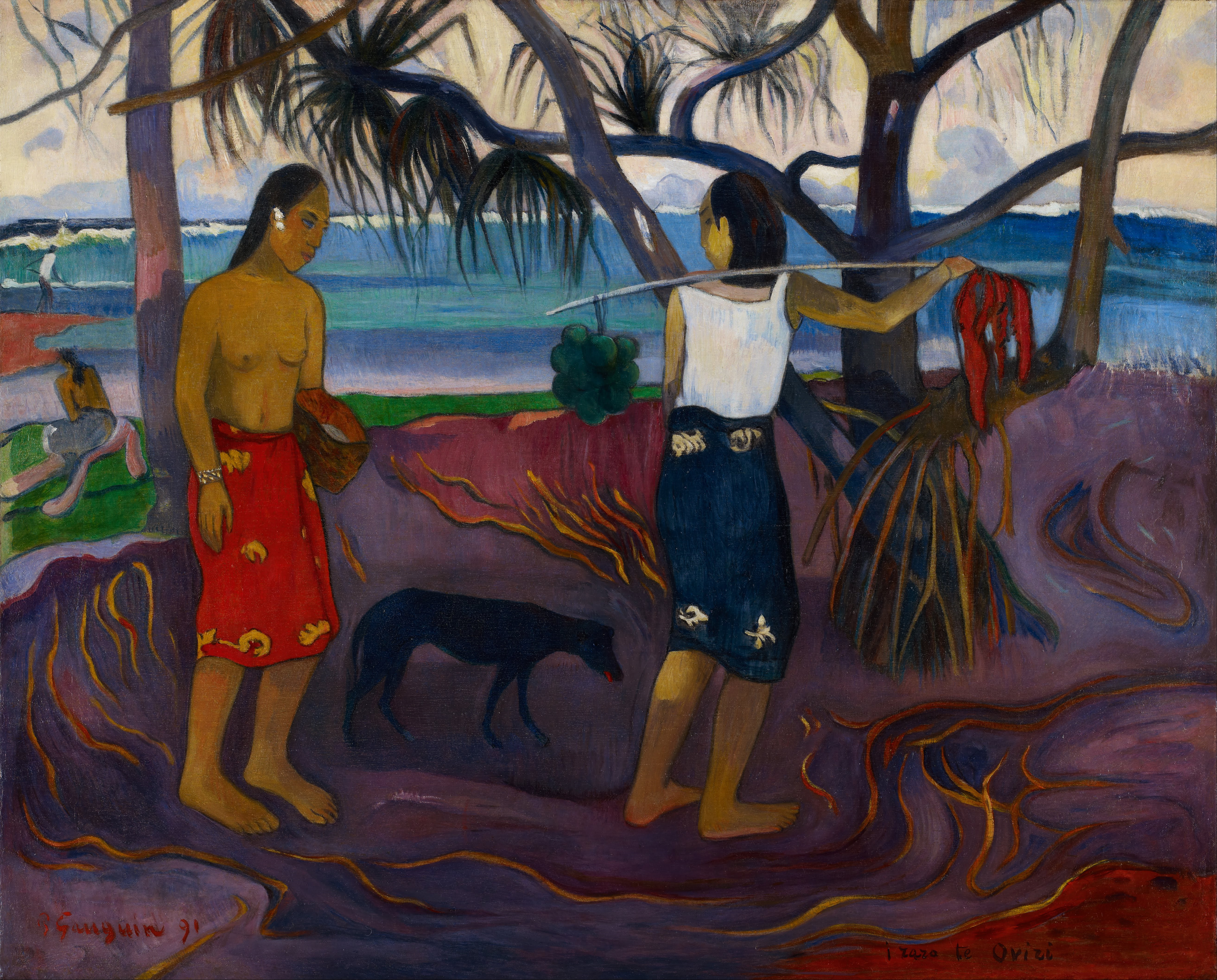

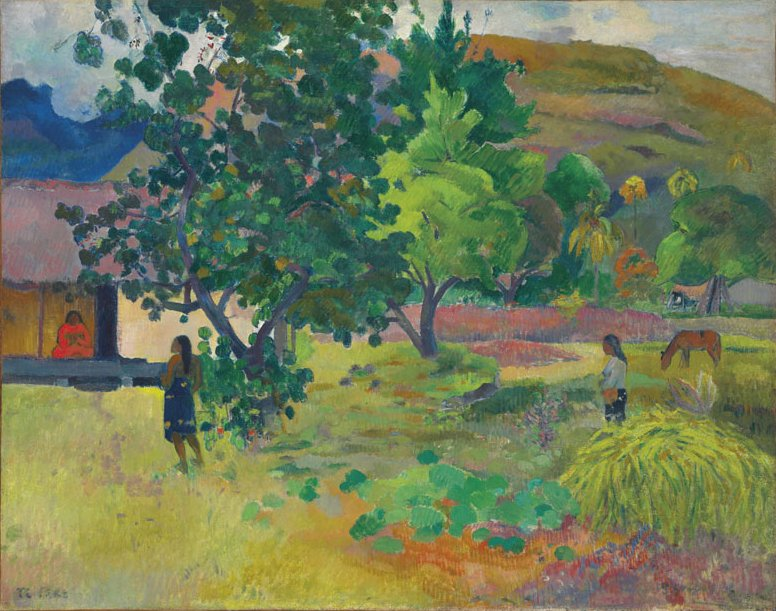

== See also ==
- List of paintings by Paul Gauguin

== References and sources ==
Sources

- Danielsson, Bengt (1965). Gauguin in the South Seas. Garden City, New York: Doubleday.
- Eisenman, Stephen F., (1999). Gauguin's Skirt. London: Thames and Hudson. ISBN 978-0500280386.
- Mathews, Nancy Mowll (2001). Paul Gauguin, an Erotic Life. New Haven, Connecticut: Yale University Press, ISBN 0-300-09109-5.
- Stuckey, Charles F. (1988). "The First Tahitian Years". The Art of Paul Gauguin. with Peter Zegers. National Gallery of Art. pp. 276-7. ISBN 0-8212-1723-2. LCCN 88-81005.
