= Parau na te varua ino =

Painting by Paul Gauguin

Parau na te Varua ino
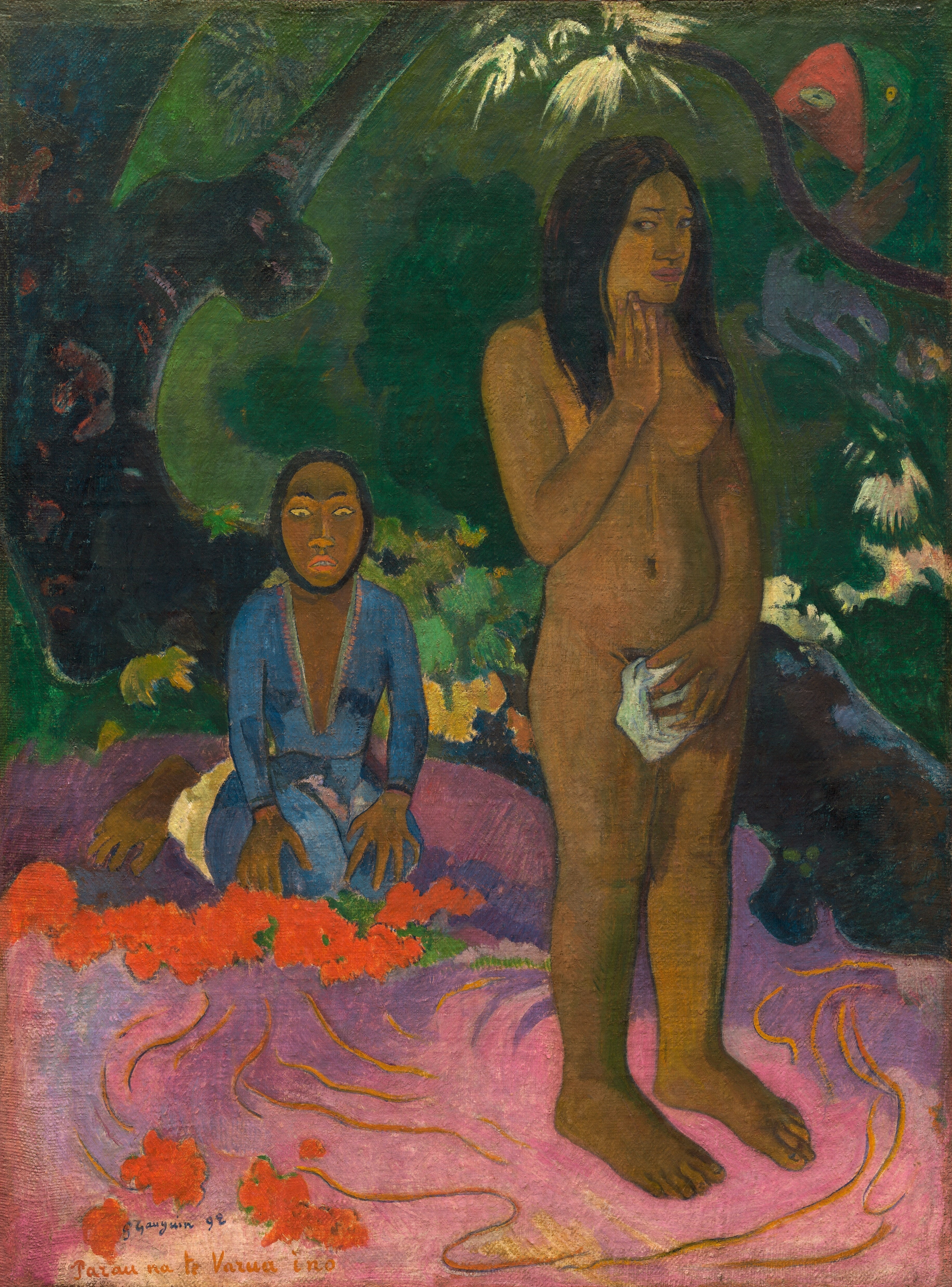
- Artist: Paul Gauguin
- Year: 1892
- Medium: oil on canvas
- Dimensions: 92 cm × 68 cm (36 in × 27 in)
- Location: National Gallery of Art , Washington

Parau na te varaua ino is an 1892 oil on canvas painting by Paul Gauguin, produced during the artist's first stay on Tahiti. It is now in the National Gallery of Art

The painting is divided in half by the same tree-root as appears in his Fatata te Miti, with greens and blacks in the top half and pinkish shades in the bottom half. In the foreground is a young nude Tahitian woman, hiding her genitalia with her left hand and her right breast with her right hand, as she looks back at a kneeling masked man behind her.

The title's meaning is unclear - 'varua ino' means devil or evil spirit, possibly referring to the male figure summoning the spirits of the dead (as also seen in Spirit of the Dead Watching), and 'parau' means words, so it may translate as Words of the Devil The work shows the painter's interest in traditional Tahitian beliefs, though the woman's nudity and pose suggest medieval depictions of Eve in the Garden of Eden or a more elongated version of the Venus de Medici, linking the work to Original Sin, loss of virginity and Gauguin's disruption of western notions of beauty.

== See also ==
- List of paintings by Paul Gauguin
