= Arearea no varua ino =

1892 painting by Paul Gauguin

- The amusement of the evil spirit, Reclining Tahitian Women
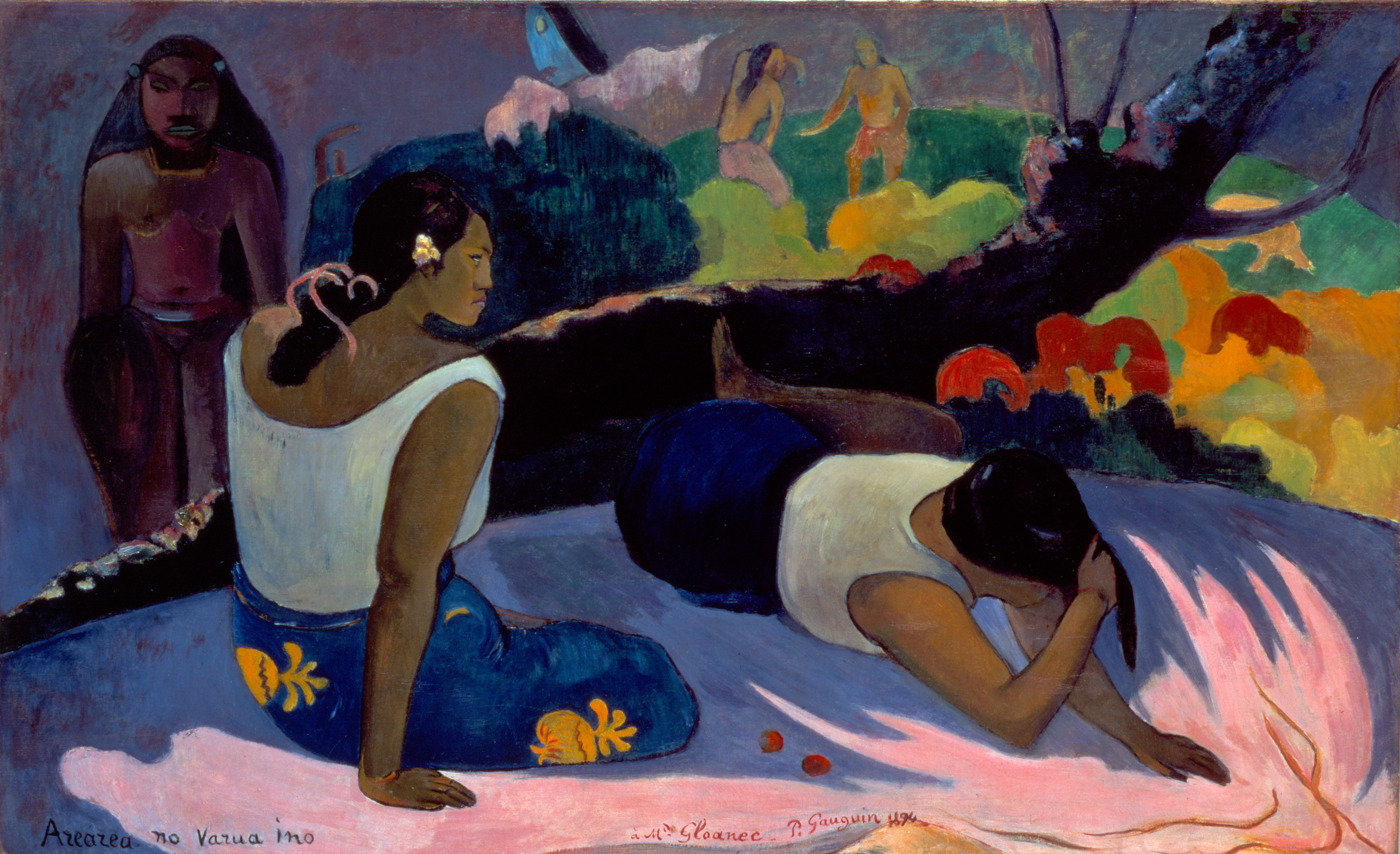
- Artist: Paul Gauguin
- Year: 1894
- Medium: oil on canvas
- Dimensions: 60 cm × 98 cm (24 in × 39 in)
- Location: Ny Carlsberg Glyptotek, Copenhagen

Arearea no varua ino is an 1894 oil-on-canvas painting by Paul Gauguin, now in the Ny Carlsberg Glyptotek in Copenhagen.

The title Gauguin inscribed in the bottom left is Arearea no varua ino, a Tahitian language phrase which is variously translated to English as "the amusement of the evil spirit" or "words of the Devil". The painting is also sometimes given the descriptive title Reclining Tahitian Women.

== Description ==
In the foreground, two Tahitian women in white shirts and blue long skirts are depicted reclining on a beach. One woman sits looking to the right with a serious expression while the other woman faces away, fully reclined with one hand holding her head, possibly washing her hair. In the left midground a statue of Hina stands in the shade, facing the viewer and the women, and to the right of that is a floating blue mask which faces the statue. Two figures dance in the background.

== Context ==
Gauguin spent some years in Tahiti, but this painting was created during a two-year period where he lived in Paris.
