= Maurice Princet =

French mathematician (1875–1973)

Maurice Princet (1875 – October 23, 1973) was a French mathematician and actuary who played a role in the birth of cubism. He was an associate of Pablo Picasso, Guillaume Apollinaire, Max Jacob, Jean Metzinger, and Marcel Duchamp. He is known as "le mathématicien du cubisme" ("the mathematician of cubism").

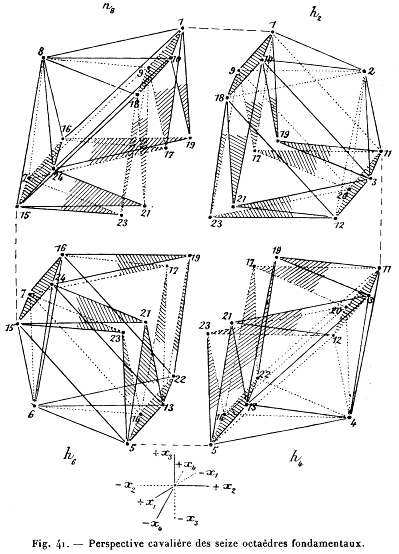
An illustration from Esprit Jouffret's Traité élémentaire de géométrie à quatre dimensions. The 1903 book, which influenced Picasso, was given to him by Princet.

Princet is credited with introducing the work of Henri Poincaré and the concept of the "fourth dimension" to the cubists at the Bateau-Lavoir. Princet brought to Picasso's attention a 1903 book by Esprit Jouffret, Traité élémentaire de géométrie à quatre dimensions (Elementary Treatise on the Geometry of Four Dimensions), a popularization of Poincaré's Science and Hypothesis in which Jouffret described hypercubes and other complex polyhedra in four dimensions and projected them onto the two-dimensional page. Picasso's sketchbooks for Les Demoiselles d'Avignon illustrate Jouffret's influence on the artist's work.

In 1907, Princet's wife left him for André Derain, and he drifted away from the circle of artists at the Bateau-Lavoir. But Princet remained close to Metzinger and participated in meetings of the Section d'Or in Puteaux. He gave informal lectures to the group, many of whom were passionate about mathematical order.

Princet's influence on the cubists was attested to by his contemporaries. Maurice de Vlaminck wrote, "I witnessed the birth of cubism, its growth, its decline. Picasso was the obstetrician, Guillaume Apollinaire the midwife, Princet the godfather."

In 1910, Metzinger said of him, "[Picasso] lays out a free, mobile perspective, from which that ingenious mathematician Maurice Princet has deduced a whole geometry". Later, Metzinger wrote in his memoirs that:

Maurice Princet joined us often. Although quite young, thanks to his knowledge of mathematics he had an important job in an insurance company. But, beyond his profession, it was as an artist that he conceptualized mathematics, as an aesthetician that he invoked n-dimensional continuums. He loved to get the artists interested in the new views on space that had been opened up by Schlegel and some others. He succeeded at that.

Louis Vauxcelles sarcastically dubbed Princet "the father of cubism":

M. Princet has studied at length non-Euclidean geometry and the theorems of Riemann, of which Gleizes and Metzinger speak rather carelessly. Now then, M. Princet one day met M. Max Jacob and confided him one or two of his discoveries relating to the fourth dimension. M. Jacob informed the ingenious M. Picasso of it, and M. Picasso saw there a possibility of new ornamental schemes. M. Picasso explained his intentions to M. Apollinaire, who hastened to write them up in formularies and codify them. The thing spread and propagated. Cubism, the child of M. Princet, was born.

Duchamp told Pierre Cabanne, "We weren't mathematicians at all, but we really did believe in Princet".

== See also ==
- Actuary
- Esprit Jouffret
- Mathematics and art
