= Esprit Jouffret =

French artillery officer, insurance actuary and mathematician

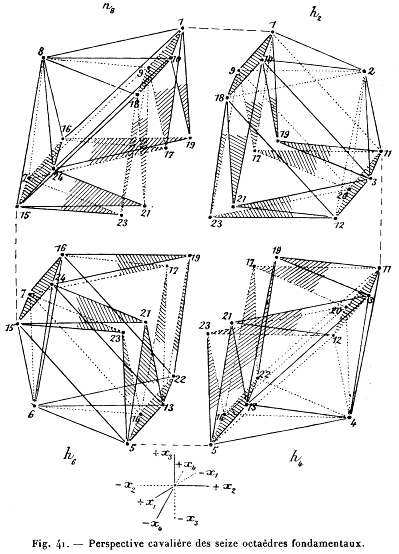
An illustration from Jouffret's Traité élémentaire de géométrie à quatre dimensions. The book, which influenced Picasso, was given to him by Princet.

Esprit Jouffret (15 March 1837 – 6 November 1904) was a French artillery officer, insurance actuary and mathematician, author of Traité élémentaire de géométrie à quatre dimensions (Elementary Treatise on the Geometry of Four Dimensions, 1903), a popularization of Henri Poincaré's Science and Hypothesis in which Jouffret described hypercubes and other complex polyhedra in four dimensions and projected them onto the two-dimensional page.

Maurice Princet brought Traite to artist Pablo Picasso's attention. Picasso's sketchbooks for his 1907 painting Les Demoiselles d'Avignon illustrate Jouffret's influence on the artist's work.

== See also ==
- Mathematics and art
- Maurice Princet
