= Seascape (disambiguation) =

A seascape is a work of art depicting the sea.

Seascape or Seascapes may also refer to:

== Arts and entertainment ==
- Seascape (play), by Edward Albee
- A Seascape. The Coast of the Island of Rügen in Evening Light, an 1818 oil painting by Johan Christian Dahl
- Seascape: Folkestone, a c. 1845 oil painting by William Turner
- Seascape. L'Estaque, a 1906 oil painting by Georges Braque
- Seascape (Slightly Cloudy), a 1969 oil painting by Gerhard Richter
- Seascapes, an Irish weekly radio programme

== Other uses ==
- MSC Seascape, a cruise ship
- Seascape (Auckland), New Zealand, a residential skyscraper development that went into receivership in 2026
- Seascape Beach Resort, Aptos, California, United States
- Seascape (strawberry), a cultivar
