= Women Bathing (Cézanne) =

Painting by Paul Cézanne

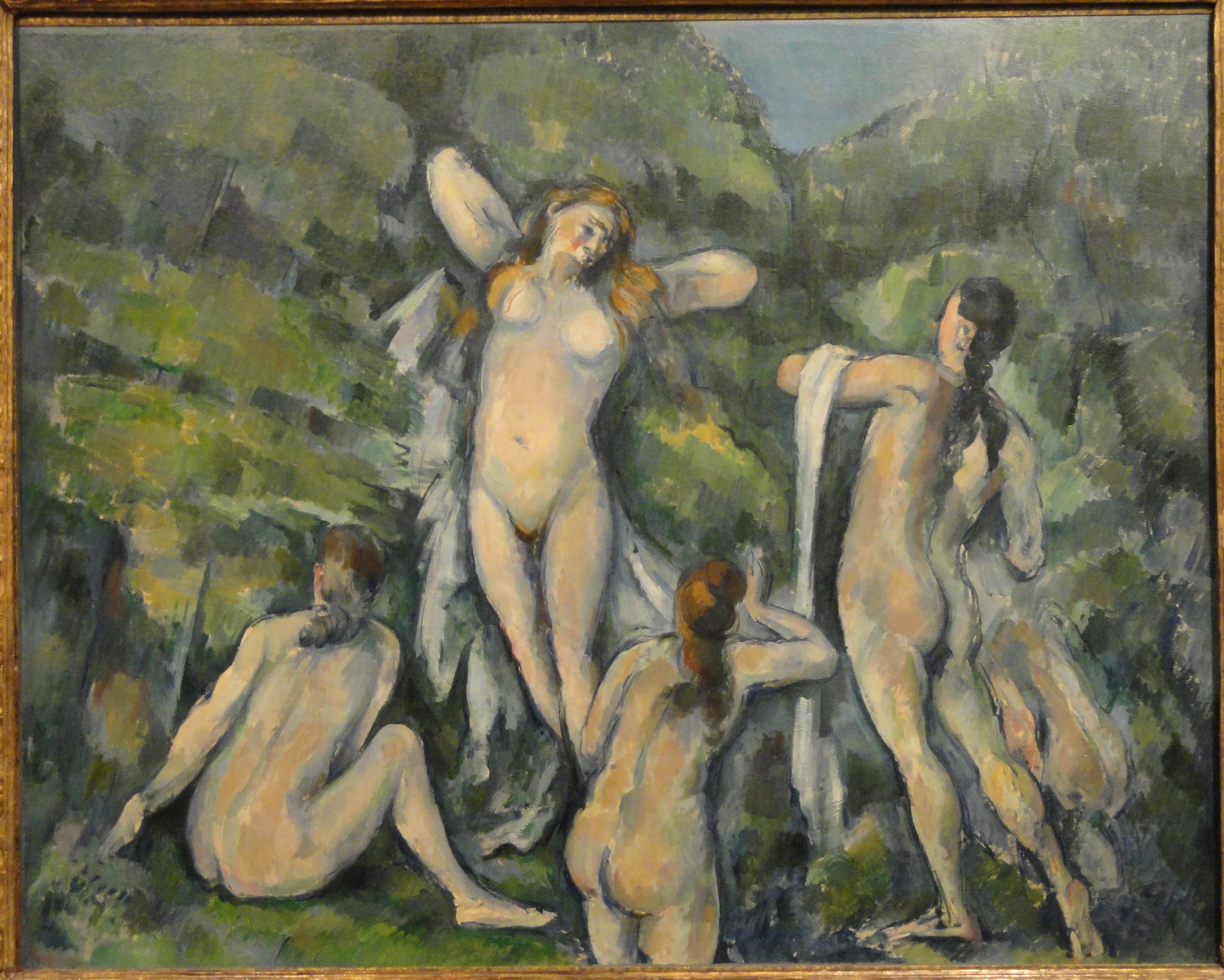
- Artist: Paul Cézanne
- Year: 1895
- Medium: Oil on canvas
- Location: Ny Carlsberg Glyptotek, Copenhagen

Women Bathing or Bathers (French: Baigneuses) is an oil on canvas painting by the French Post-Impressionist painter Paul Cézanne, from 1895. It is held in the Ny Carlsberg Glyptotek, in Copenhagen.

== History and description ==
Individual or grouped male or female bathers were a major theme in his work since the 1870s, most notably his so-called Big Bathers (Philadelphia Museum of Art).

In this painting, nude women are placed in a space without a defined time or place. The light-colored figures stand out sharply against the faded green background and appear united by a single, harmonious visual rhythm. Originally, the painting featured five bathers; the shadowed outline of another woman can still be seen on the right side of the canvas. Cézanne, likely dissatisfied with his original concept, later altered the painting by removing one of the bathers, thereby achieving greater compositional stability. The painting was executed in Cézanne's characteristic style of paired brushstrokes. The resulting effect had a certain influence on Cubism, although this was only noted by critics more than a decade after the work's completion.

== See also ==
- List of paintings by Paul Cézanne
