= Blue Nude (Souvenir de Biskra) =

Painting by Henri Matisse

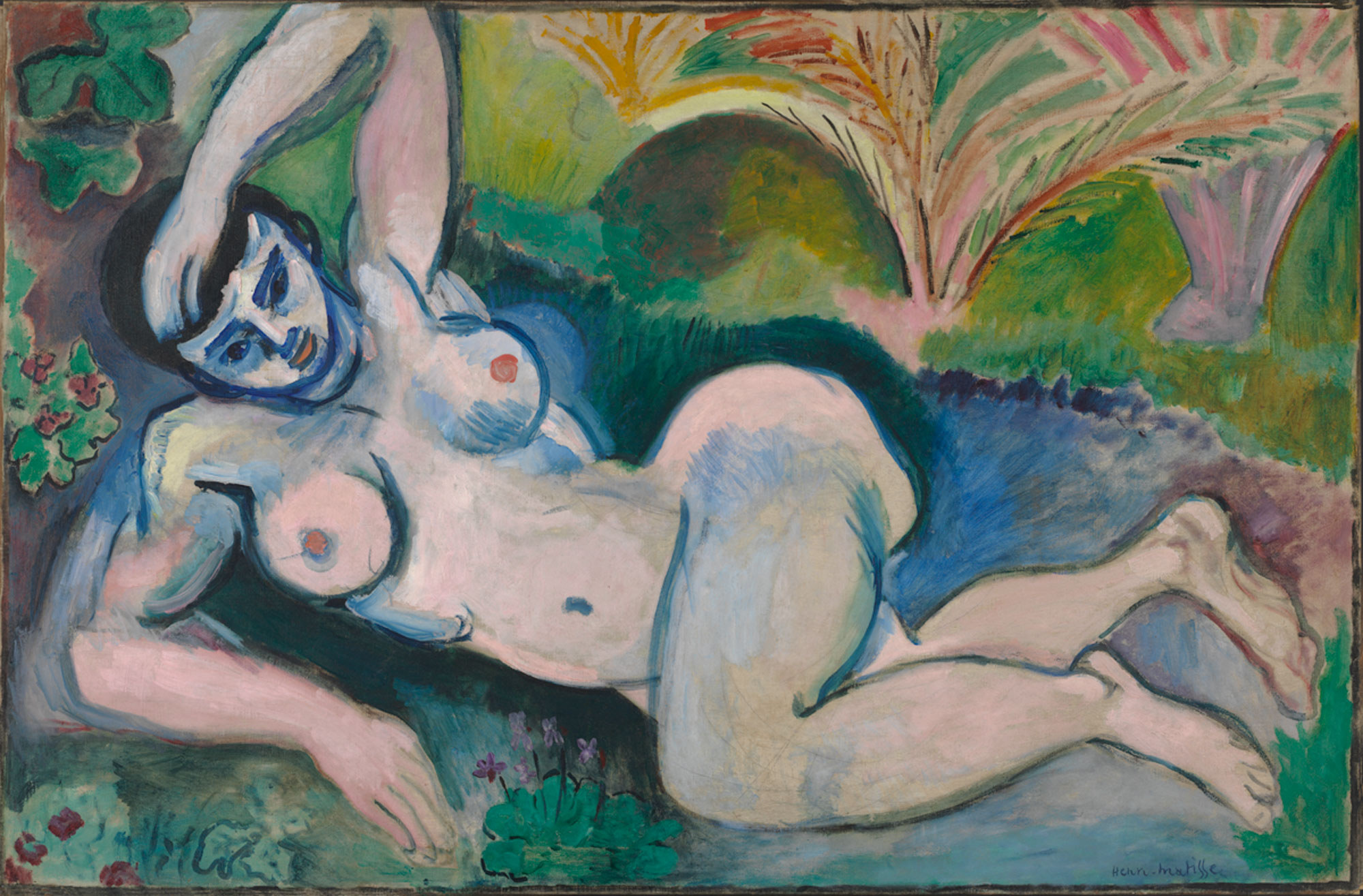
- Artist: Henri Matisse
- Year: 1907
- Medium: Oil on canvas
- Movement: Fauvism
- Dimensions: 92.1 cm × 140.3 cm (36.3 in × 55.2 in)
- Location: Baltimore Museum of Art, Baltimore

Blue Nude (Souvenir of Biskra) (French: "Nu bleu, Souvenir de Biskra"), an early 1907 oil painting on canvas by Henri Matisse, is located at the Baltimore Museum of Art as part of the Cone Collection.

== History ==
Matisse painted the nude when a sculpture he was working on shattered. He later finished the sculpture which is entitled Reclining Nude I (Aurore).

Matisse shocked the French public at the 1907 Société des Artistes Indépendants when he exhibited Blue Nude (Souvenir de Biskra). Blue Nude was one of the paintings that would later create an international sensation at the Armory Show of 1913 in New York City.

The painting, which may be classified as Fauvist, was controversial; in 1913, it was burned in effigy by students critical of the avant-garde outside of the Armory Show in Chicago, to where it had toured from New York. In 1907 the painting had a strong effect on Georges Braque and Pablo Picasso, partially motivating Picasso to create Les Demoiselles D'Avignon.

== Subject ==
The painting's title mentions Biskra, a town in North Africa. In Matisse's time, Germany and France were fighting in North Africa to increase their colonial holdings there. In 1844, French soldiers arrived in Biskra, and eventually missions there brought back images to Parisian media outlets depicting the region as a fertile oasis in a vast desert. Tribes around Biskra are famous for their textile work using indigo dyes. The dyes stained the limbs of women who worked with it blue.

The subject of the painting is a nude woman reclining in a Mediterranean landscape, presumably Biskra. The lines are thick and colorful, and the woman is muscular. Matisse is sexualizing the woman yet painting her in a harsh, crude way to repel the viewer. Some scholars argue that Matisse is depicting North Africa as sexually available in the sense that one could dominate/rape/consume it in the same way one could a woman. This also plays into period-typical ideas surrounding the sexual openness of "foreign women" (see Gerome, The Slave Market, 1966). Some argue Matisse is repudiating Western culture though Primitivism, and some say he is ultimately reinforcing its ideals in the way that he does it.

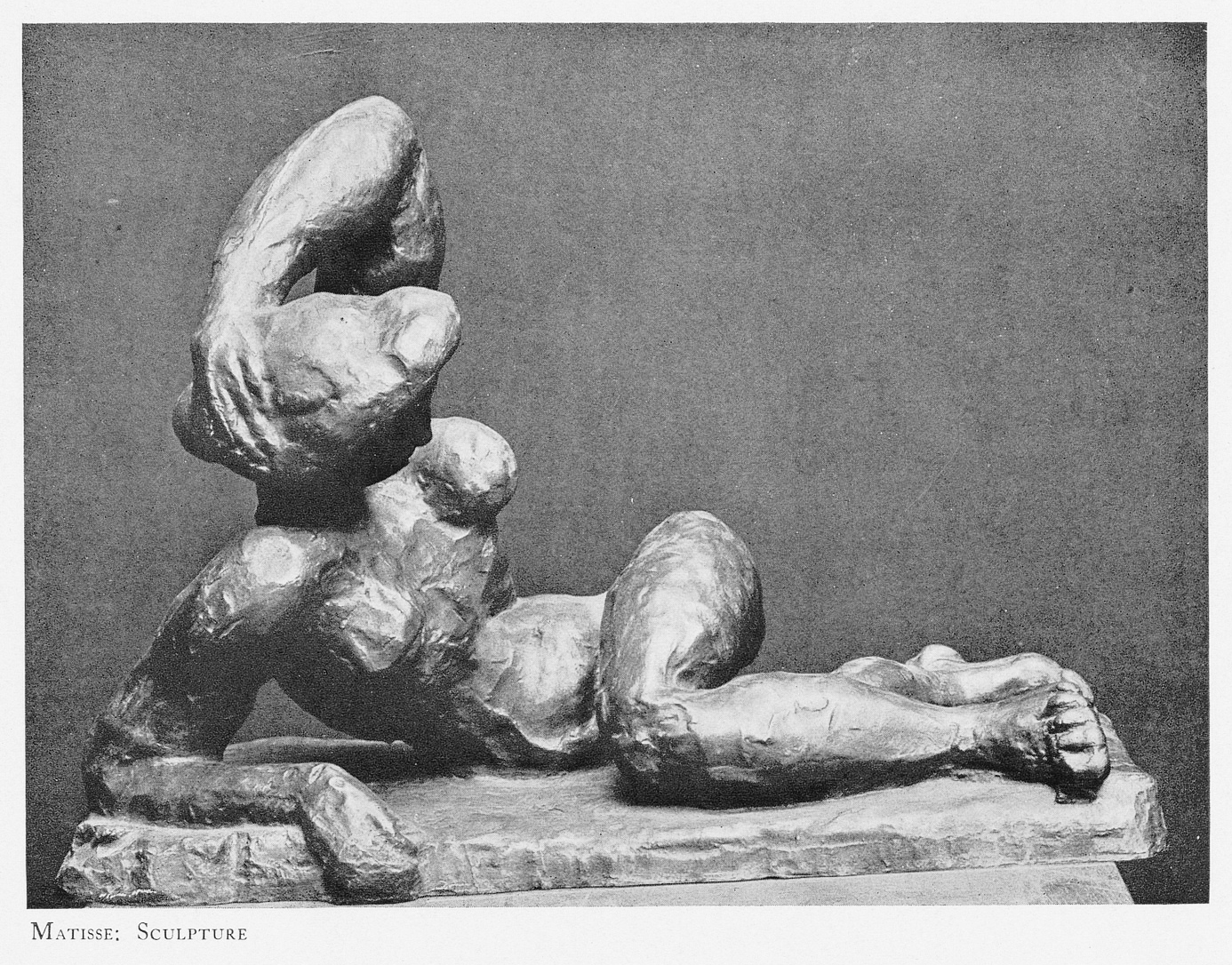
Henri Matisse, 1906–07, Nu couché, I, Aurore (Reclining Nude, I), exhibited at Montross Gallery, New York, 1915

== See also ==
- List of works by Henri Matisse
- 100 Great Paintings, 1980 BBC series
