= Seascape. L'Estaque =

Painting by Georges Braque

- Artist: Georges Braque
- Year: 1906
- Medium: Oil on canvas
- Dimensions: 59 cm × 72.4 cm (23 in × 28.5 in)
- Location: Thyssen-Bornemisza Museum; Madrid

Seascape. L'Estaque is an oil-on-canvas painting by the French artist Georges Braque, created in 1906. The painting is in the Thyssen-Bornemisza Museum, in Madrid.

== Description and analysis ==
The painting depicts a view, from a small hill framed by trees, of the small fishing village of L'Estaque, located near Marseille.

This is actually one of the few purely fauvist paintings of Braque. It is characterized by the arbitrary use of color, a harmony that covers the entire palette of colors, and by the extensive areas of unpainted canvas. However, in comparison with the famous fauvist painting by Henri Matisse, The Joy of Life, which may have served as an inspiration for the artist, there is obviously a great interest in creating a sense of depth through the presence of successively receding plans.

Braque moved to L'Estaque following in the footsteps of Post-Impressionist master Paul Cézanne, and it was under his influence, and of his friend Pablo Picasso, that, one year later, he moved towards cubism.
