= Les Demoiselles d'Avignon =

1907 painting by Pablo Picasso

- The Ladies of Avignon (English)
- Artist: Pablo Picasso
- Year: 1907
- Catalogue: 79766
- Medium: Oil on canvas
- Movement: Proto-Cubism
- Dimensions: 243.9 cm × 233.7 cm (96 in × 92 in)
- Location: Museum of Modern Art. Acquired through the Lillie P. Bliss Bequest, New York City
- Accession: 333.1939

Les Demoiselles d'Avignon (pronounced [le demwazɛl d‿aviɲɔ̃]; The Young Ladies of Avignon, originally titled The Brothel of Avignon) is a large oil painting created in 1907 by the Spanish artist Pablo Picasso. Part of the permanent collection of the Museum of Modern Art in New York, it portrays five nude female prostitutes in a brothel on Carrer d'Avinyó, a street in Barcelona, Spain. The figures are confrontational and not conventionally feminine, being rendered with angular and disjointed body shapes, some to a menacing degree. The far left figure exhibits facial features and dress of Egyptian or southern Asian style. The two adjacent figures are in an Iberian style of Picasso's Spain, while the two on the right have African mask-like features. Picasso said the ethnic primitivism evoked in these masks moved him to "liberate an utterly original artistic style of compelling, even savage force" leading him to add a shamanistic aspect to his project.

Drawing from tribal primitivism while eschewing central dictates of Renaissance perspective and verisimilitude for a compressed picture plane using a Baroque composition while employing Velazquez's confrontational approach seen in Las Meninas, Picasso sought to take the lead of the avant-garde from Henri Matisse. John Richardson said Demoiselles made Picasso the most pivotal artist in Western painting since Giotto and laid a path forward for Picasso and Georges Braque to follow in their joint development of cubism, the effects of which on modern art were profound and unsurpassed in the 20th century.

Les Demoiselles was revolutionary, controversial and led to widespread anger and disagreement, even amongst the painter's closest associates and friends. Henri Matisse considered the work something of a bad joke yet indirectly reacted to it in his 1908 Bathers with a Turtle. Georges Braque too initially disliked the painting yet studied the work in great detail. His subsequent friendship and collaboration with Picasso led to the cubist revolution. Its resemblance to Paul Cézanne's The Bathers, Paul Gauguin's statue Oviri and El Greco's Opening of the Fifth Seal has been widely discussed by later critics.

At the time of its first exhibition in 1916, the painting was deemed immoral. Painted in Picasso's studio in the Bateau-Lavoir in Montmartre, Paris, it was seen publicly for the first time at the Salon d'Antin in July 1916, at an exhibition organized by the poet André Salmon. It was at this exhibition that Salmon, who had previously titled the painting in 1912 Le bordel philosophique, renamed it to its current, less scandalous title, Les Demoiselles d'Avignon, instead of the title originally chosen by Picasso, Le Bordel d'Avignon. Picasso, who always referred to it as mon bordel ("my brothel"), or Le Bordel d'Avignon, never liked Salmon's title and would have instead preferred the bowdlerization Las chicas de Avignon ("The Girls of Avignon").

== Background and development ==
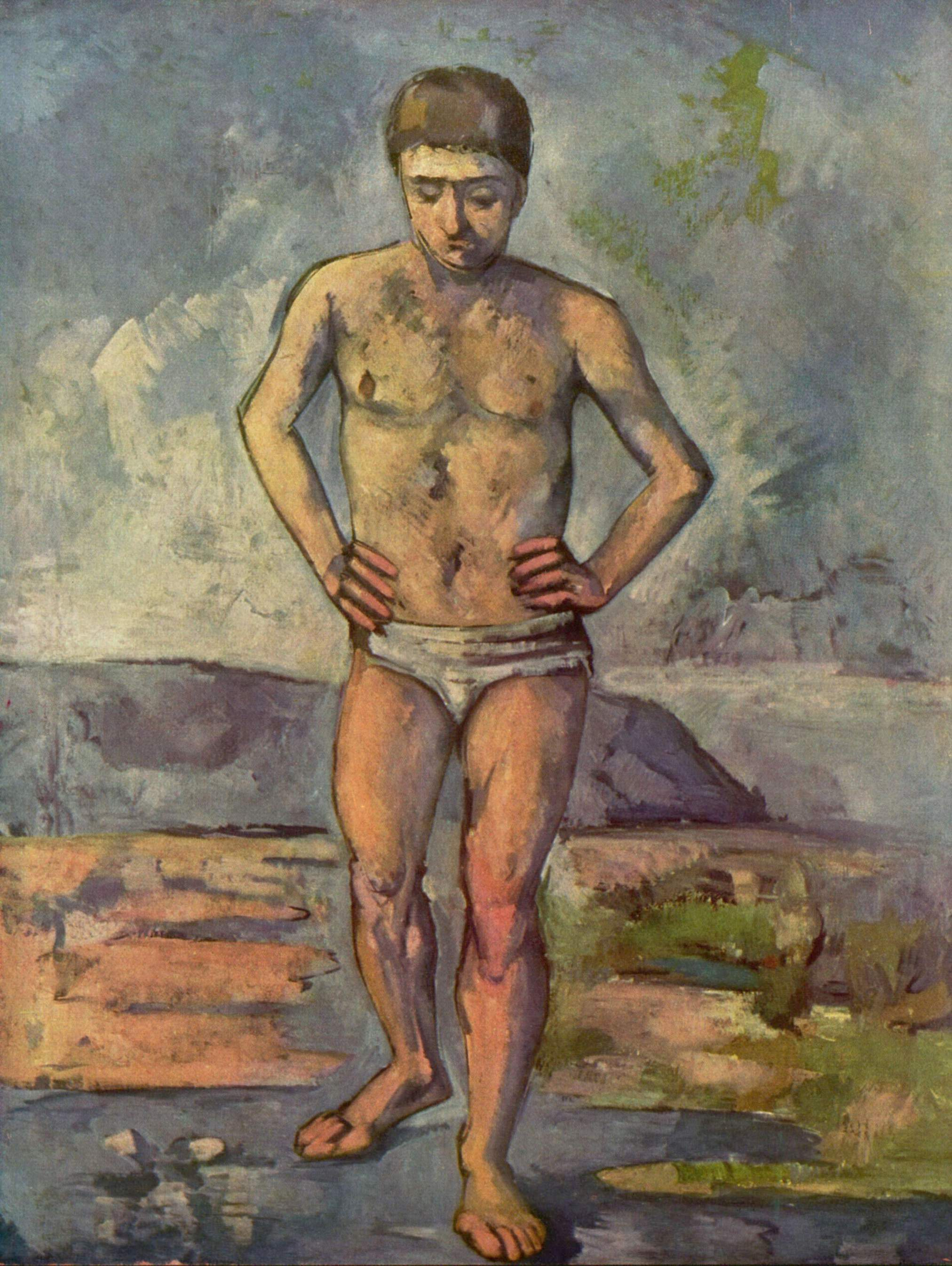
Paul Cézanne, Bather, 1885–1887, Museum of Modern Art, formerly collection Lillie P. Bliss

Picasso came into his own as an important artist during the first decade of the 20th century. He arrived in Paris from Spain around the turn of the century as a young, ambitious painter out to make a name for himself. For several years he alternated between living and working in Barcelona, Madrid and the Spanish countryside, and made frequent trips to Paris.

By 1904, he was fully settled in Paris and had established several studios, important relationships with both friends and colleagues. Between 1901 and 1904, Picasso began to achieve recognition for his Blue Period paintings. In the main these were studies of poverty and desperation based on scenes he had seen in Spain and Paris at the turn of the century. Subjects included gaunt families, blind figures, and personal encounters; other paintings depicted his friends, but most reflected and expressed a sense of blueness and despair.

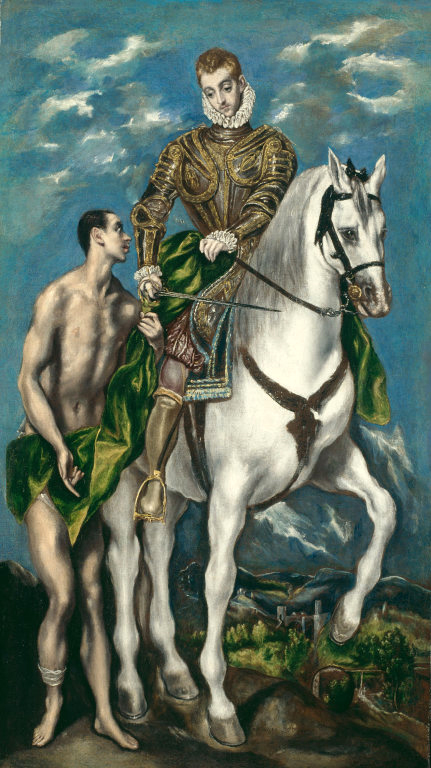
El Greco, Saint Martin and the Beggar, c. 1597–1600, Art Institute of Chicago

Pablo Picasso, Boy Leading a Horse 1905–06, Museum of Modern Art

Picasso's Rose Period work Boy Leading a Horse, recalls the paintings of Paul Cézanne and El Greco, who heavily influenced Les Demoiselles d'Avignon.

He followed his success by developing into his Rose Period from 1904 to 1907, which introduced a strong element of sensuality and sexuality into his work. The Rose Period depictions of acrobats, circus performers and theatrical characters are rendered in warmer, brighter colors and are far more hopeful and joyful in their depictions of the bohemian life in the Parisian avant-garde and its environs. The Rose Period produced two important large masterpieces: Family of Saltimbanques (1905), which recalls the work of Gustave Courbet (1819–1877) and Édouard Manet (1832–1883); and Boy Leading a Horse (1905–06), which recalls Cézanne's Bather (1885–1887) and El Greco's Saint Martin and the Beggar (1597–1599). While he already had a considerable following by the middle of 1906, Picasso enjoyed further success with his paintings of massive oversized nude women, monumental sculptural figures that recalled the work of Paul Gauguin and showed his interest in primitive (African, Micronesian, Native American) art. He began exhibiting his work in the galleries of Berthe Weill (1865–1951) and Ambroise Vollard (1866–1939), quickly gaining a growing reputation and a following amongst the artistic communities of Montmartre and Montparnasse.

Picasso became a favorite of the American art collectors Gertrude Stein and her brother Leo around 1905. The Steins' older brother Michael and his wife Sarah also became collectors of his work. Picasso painted portraits of both Gertrude Stein and her nephew Allan Stein.

Gertrude Stein began acquiring Picasso's drawings and paintings and exhibiting them in her informal Salon at her home in Paris. At one of her gatherings in 1905 he met Henri Matisse (1869–1954), who was to become in those days his chief rival, although in later years a close friend. The Steins introduced Picasso to Claribel Cone (1864–1929), and her sister Etta Cone (1870–1949), also American art collectors, who began to acquire Picasso and Matisse's paintings. Eventually Leo Stein moved to Italy, and Michael and Sarah Stein became important patrons of Matisse, while Gertrude Stein continued to collect Picasso.

== Rivalry with Matisse ==
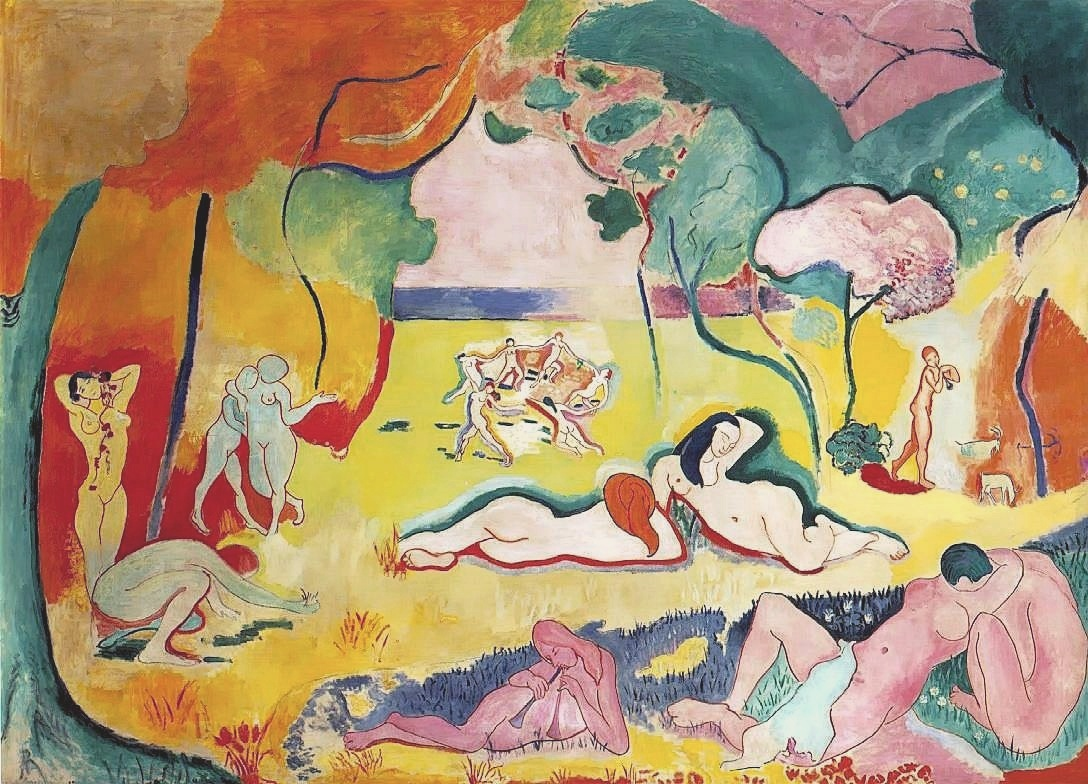
Henri Matisse, Le bonheur de vivre (1905–06), oil on canvas, 175 × 241 cm. Barnes Foundation, Merion, PA. A painting that was called Fauvist and brought Matisse both public derision and notoriety. Hilton Kramer wrote: "owing to its long sequestration in the collection of the Barnes Foundation, which never permitted its reproduction in color, it is the least familiar of modern masterpieces. Yet this painting was Matisse's own response to the hostility his work had met with in the Salon d'Automne of 1905."

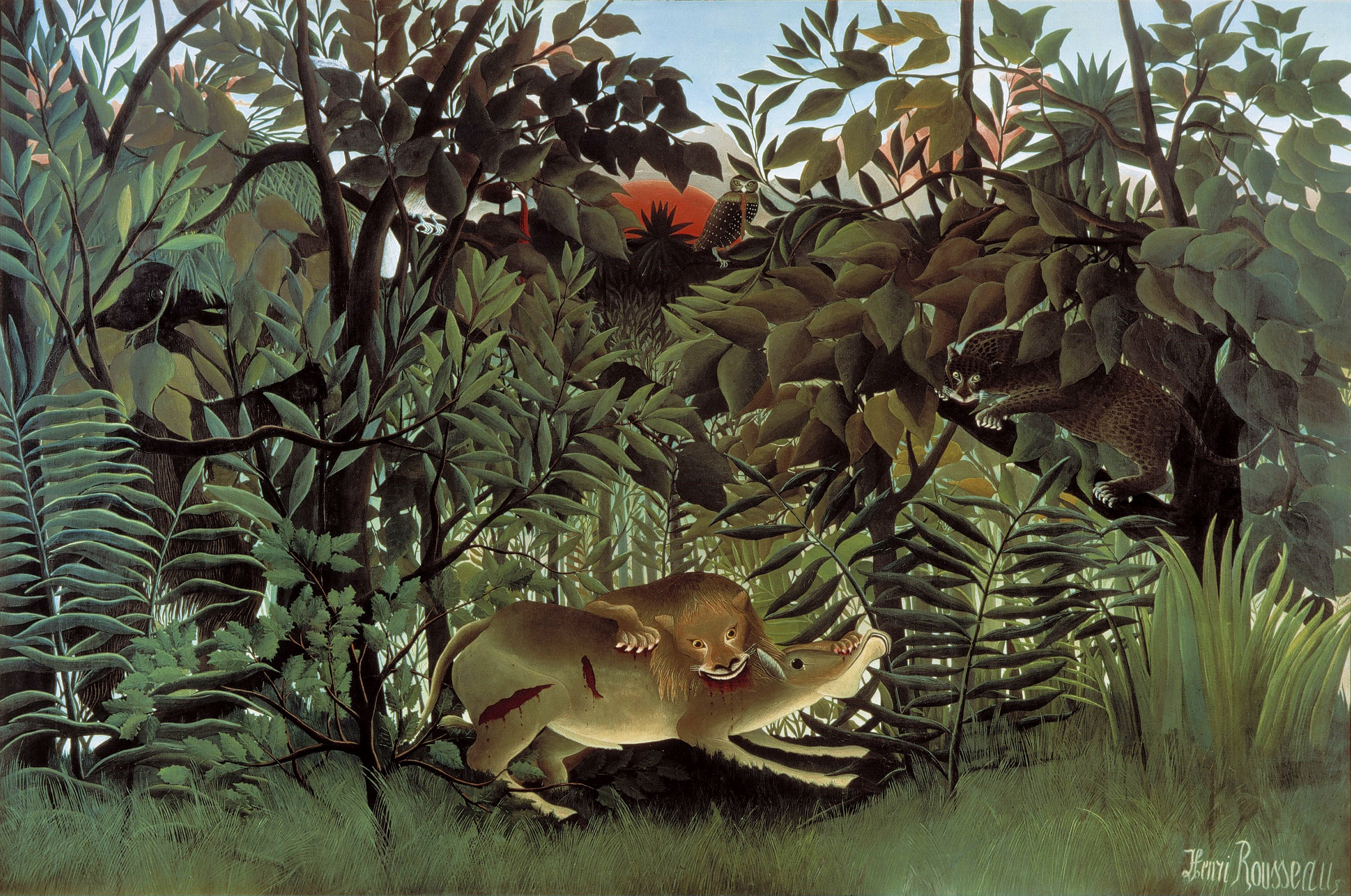
Henri Rousseau, The Hungry Lion Throws Itself on the Antelope, 1905, was the reason for the term Fauvism, and the original "Wild Beast"

The Salon d'Automne of 1905 brought notoriety and attention to the works of Henri Matisse and the Les Fauves group. The latter gained their name after critic Louis Vauxcelles described their work with the phrase "Donatello chez les fauves" ("Donatello among the wild beasts"), contrasting the paintings with a Renaissance-type sculpture that shared the room with them. Henri Rousseau (1844–1910), an artist whom Picasso knew and admired and who was not a Fauve, had his large jungle scene The Hungry Lion Throws Itself on the Antelope also hanging near the works by Matisse and which may have had an influence on the particular sarcastic term used in the press. Vauxcelles' comment was printed on 17 October 1905 in the daily newspaper Gil Blas, and passed into popular usage.

Although the pictures were widely derided—"A pot of paint has been flung in the face of the public", declared the critic Camille Mauclair (1872–1945)—they also attracted some favorable attention. The painting that was singled out for the most attacks was Matisse's Woman with a Hat; the purchase of this work by Gertrude and Leo Stein had a very positive effect on Matisse, who was suffering demoralization from the bad reception of his work.

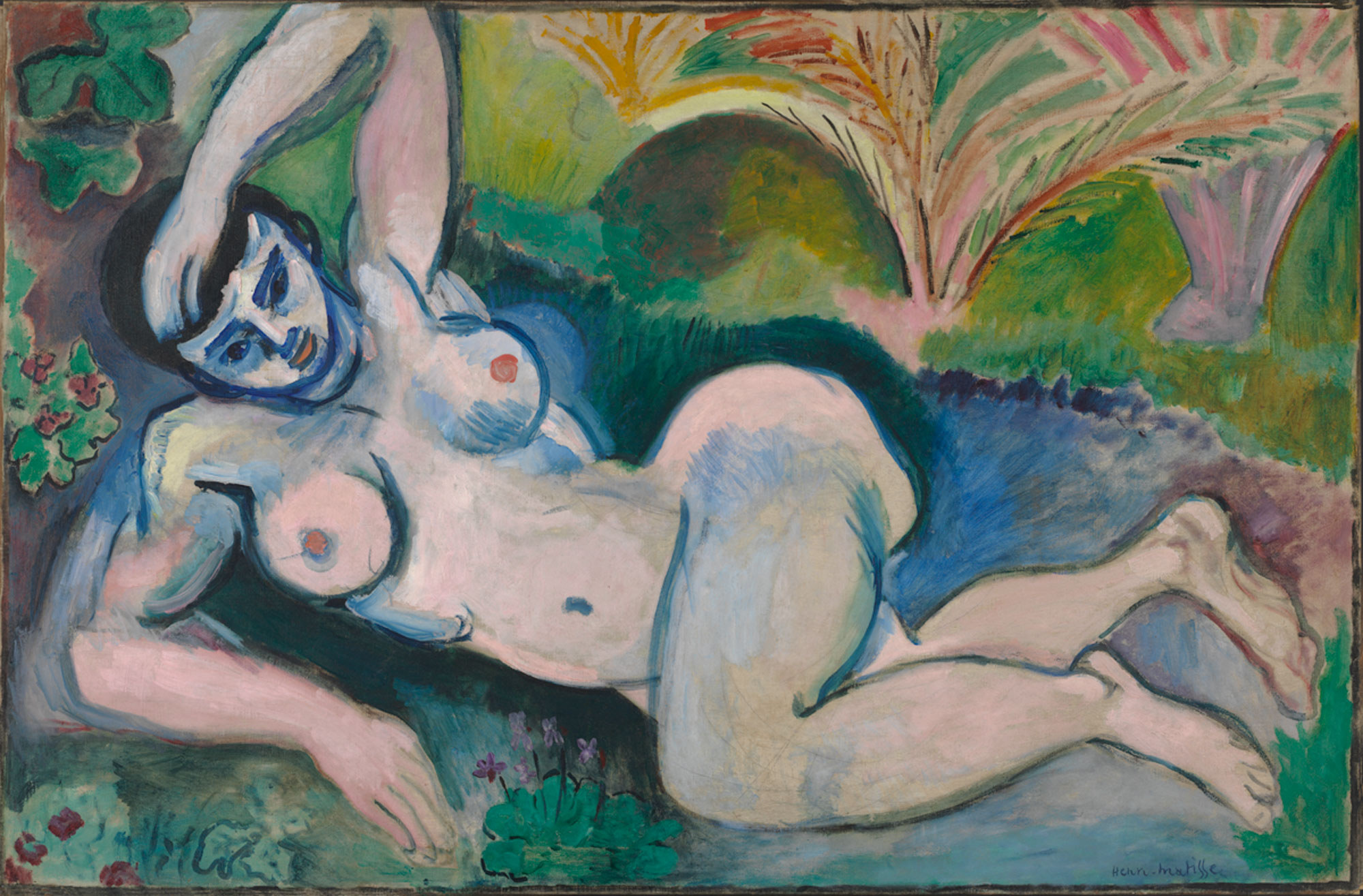
Henri Matisse, Blue Nude (Souvenir de Biskra), 1907, 92 × 140 cm, Baltimore Museum of Art. One of the paintings that created an international sensation at the Armory Show of 1913 in New York City

Matisse's notoriety and preeminence as the leader of the new movement in modern painting continued to build throughout 1906 and 1907, and Matisse attracted a following of artists including Georges Braque (1882–1963), André Derain (1880–1954), Maurice de Vlaminck (1876–1958). Picasso's work had passed through his Blue Period and his Rose Period and while he had a considerable following his reputation was tame in comparison to his rival Matisse. The larger theme of Matisse's influential Le bonheur de vivre, an exploration of "The Golden Age", evokes the historic "Ages of Man" theme and the potentials of a provocative new age that the twentieth century era offered. An equally bold, similarly themed painting titled The Golden Age, completed by Derain in 1905, shows the transfer of human ages in an even more direct way.

Matisse and Derain shocked the French public again at the March 1907 Société des Artistes Indépendants when Matisse exhibited his painting Blue Nude and Derain contributed The Bathers. Both paintings evoke ideas of human origins (world beginnings, evolution) an increasingly important theme in Paris at this time. The Blue Nude was one of the paintings that would later create an international sensation at the Armory Show of 1913 in New York City.

From October 1906 when he began preparatory work for Les Demoiselles d'Avignon, until its completion in March 1907, Picasso was vying with Matisse to be perceived as the leader of Modern painting. Upon its completion the shock and the impact of the painting propelled Picasso into the center of controversy and all but knocked Matisse and Fauvism off the map, virtually ending the movement by the following year. In 1907 Picasso joined the art gallery that had recently been opened in Paris by Daniel-Henry Kahnweiler (1884–1979). Kahnweiler was a German art historian and collector who became one of the premier French art dealers of the 20th century. He became prominent in Paris beginning in 1907 for being among the first champions of Picasso, and especially his painting Les Demoiselles d'Avignon. Before 1910 Picasso was already being recognized as one of the important leaders of Modern art alongside Henri Matisse, who had been the undisputed leader of Fauvism and who was more than ten years older than he, and his contemporaries the Fauvist André Derain and the former Fauvist and fellow Cubist, Georges Braque.

In his 1992 essay Reflections on Matisse, the art critic Hilton Kramer wrote,

After the impact of Les Demoiselles d'Avignon, however, Matisse was never again mistaken for an avant-garde incendiary. With the bizarre painting that appalled and electrified the cognoscenti, which understood the Les Demoiselles was at once a response to Matisse's Le bonheur de vivre (1905–1906) and an assault upon the tradition from which it derived, Picasso effectively appropriated the role of avant-garde wild beast—a role that, as far as public opinion was concerned, he was never to relinquish.

Kramer goes on to say,

Whereas Matisse had drawn upon a long tradition of European painting—from Giorgione, Poussin, and Watteau to Ingres, Cézanne, and Gauguin—to create a modern version of a pastoral paradise in Le bonheur de vivre, Picasso had turned to an alien tradition of primitive art to create in Les Demoiselles a netherworld of strange gods and violent emotions. As between the mythological nymphs of Le bonheur de vivre and the grotesque effigies of Les Demoiselles, there was no question as to which was the more shocking or more intended to be shocking. Picasso had unleashed a vein of feeling that was to have immense consequences for the art and culture of the modern era while Matisse's ambition came to seem, as he said in his Notes of a Painter, more limited—limited that is, to the realm of aesthetic pleasure. There was thus opened up, in the very first decade of the century and in the work of its two greatest artists, the chasm that has continued to divide the art of the modern era down to our own time.

== Influences ==
Picasso created hundreds of sketches and studies in preparation for the final work. He long acknowledged the importance of Spanish art and Iberian sculpture as influences on the painting. The work is believed by critics to be influenced by African tribal masks and the art of Oceania, although Picasso denied the connection; many art historians remain skeptical about his denials. Picasso spent an October 1906 evening closely studying a Teke figure from Congo then owned by Matisse. It was later that night that Picasso's first studies for what would become Les Demoiselles d'Avignon were created. Several experts maintain that, at the very least, Picasso visited the Musée d'Ethnographie du Trocadéro (known later as the Musée de l'Homme) in the spring of 1907 where he saw and sought inspiration from African and other arts shortly before completing Les Demoiselles. He had come to this museum originally to study plaster casts of medieval sculptures, then also considered examples of "primitive" art.

=== El Greco ===
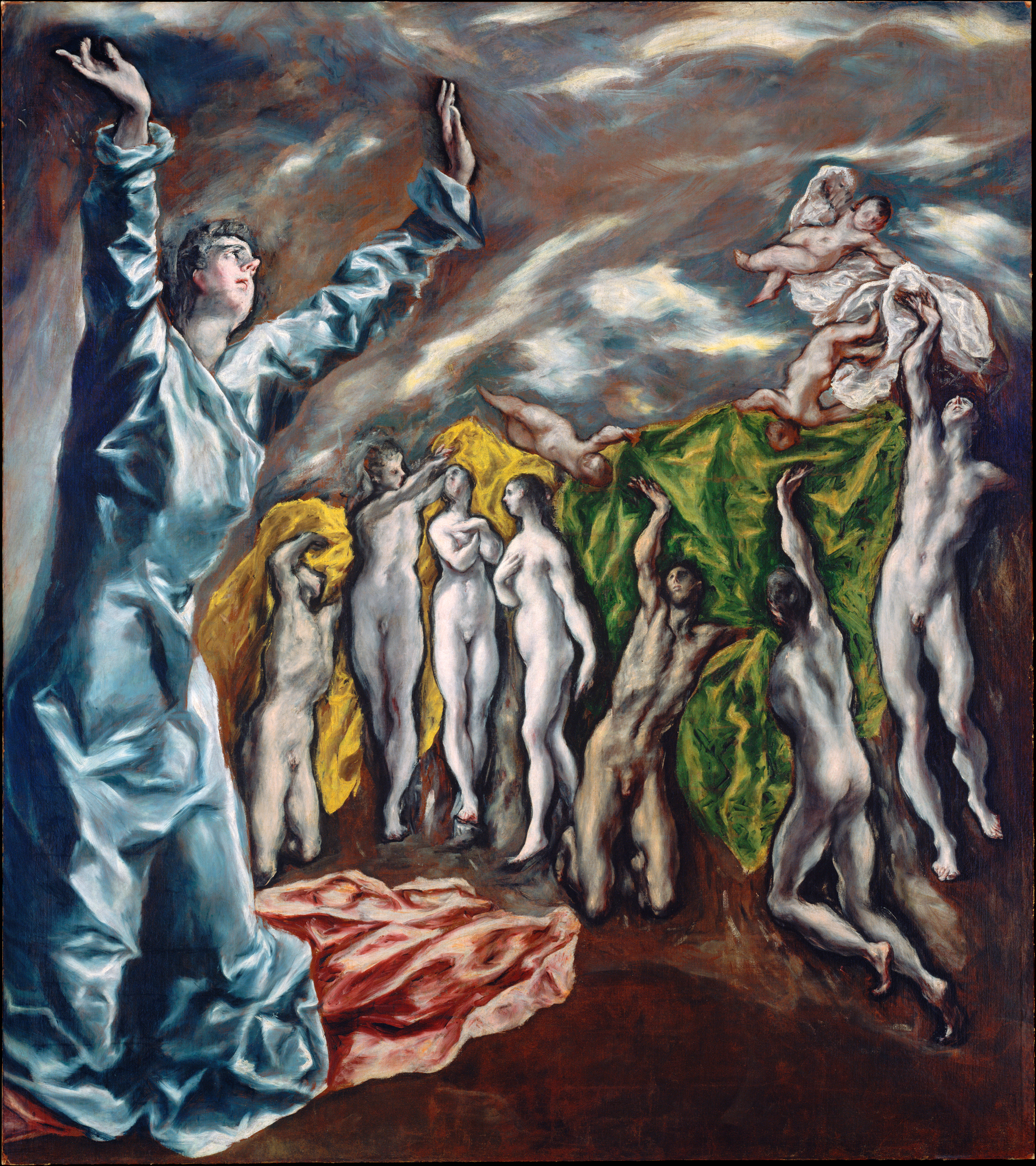
El Greco, The Opening of the Fifth Seal, 1608–1614

Pablo Picasso, Nus (Nudes), 1905, graphite on paper

El Greco's paintings, such as this Apocalyptic Vision of Saint John, have been suggested as a source of inspiration for Picasso leading up to Les Demoiselles d' Avignon.

In 1907, when Picasso began work on Les Demoiselles, one of the old master painters he greatly admired was El Greco (1541–1614), who at the time was largely obscure and under-appreciated. Picasso's friend Ignacio Zuloaga (1870–1945) acquired El Greco's masterpiece, the Opening of the Fifth Seal, in 1897 for 1000 pesetas. The relation between Les Demoiselles d'Avignon and the Opening of the Fifth Seal was pinpointed in the early 1980s, when the stylistic similarities and the relationship between the motifs and visually identifying qualities of both works were analyzed.

El Greco's painting, which Picasso studied repeatedly in Zuloaga's house, inspired not only the size, format, and composition of Les Demoiselles d'Avignon, but also its apocalyptic power. Later, speaking of the work to Dor de la Souchère in Antibes, Picasso said: "In any case, only the execution counts. From this point of view, it is correct to say that Cubism has a Spanish origin and that I invented Cubism. We must look for the Spanish influence in Cézanne. Things themselves necessitate it, the influence of El Greco, a Venetian painter, on him. But his structure is Cubist."

The relationship of the painting to other group portraits in the Western tradition, such as Diana and Callisto by Titian (1488–1576), and the same subject by Peter Paul Rubens (1577–1640), in the Prado, has also been discussed.

=== Cézanne and Cubism ===
Paul Gauguin (1848–1903) and Paul Cézanne (1839–1906) were accorded major posthumous retrospective exhibitions at the Salon d'Automne in Paris between 1903 and 1907, and both were important influences on Picasso and instrumental to his creation of Les Demoiselles. According to the English art historian, collector and author of The Cubist Epoch, Douglas Cooper, both of those artists were particularly influential to the formation of Cubism and especially important to the paintings of Picasso during 1906 and 1907. Cooper goes on to say however Les Demoiselles is often erroneously referred to as the first Cubist painting. He explains,

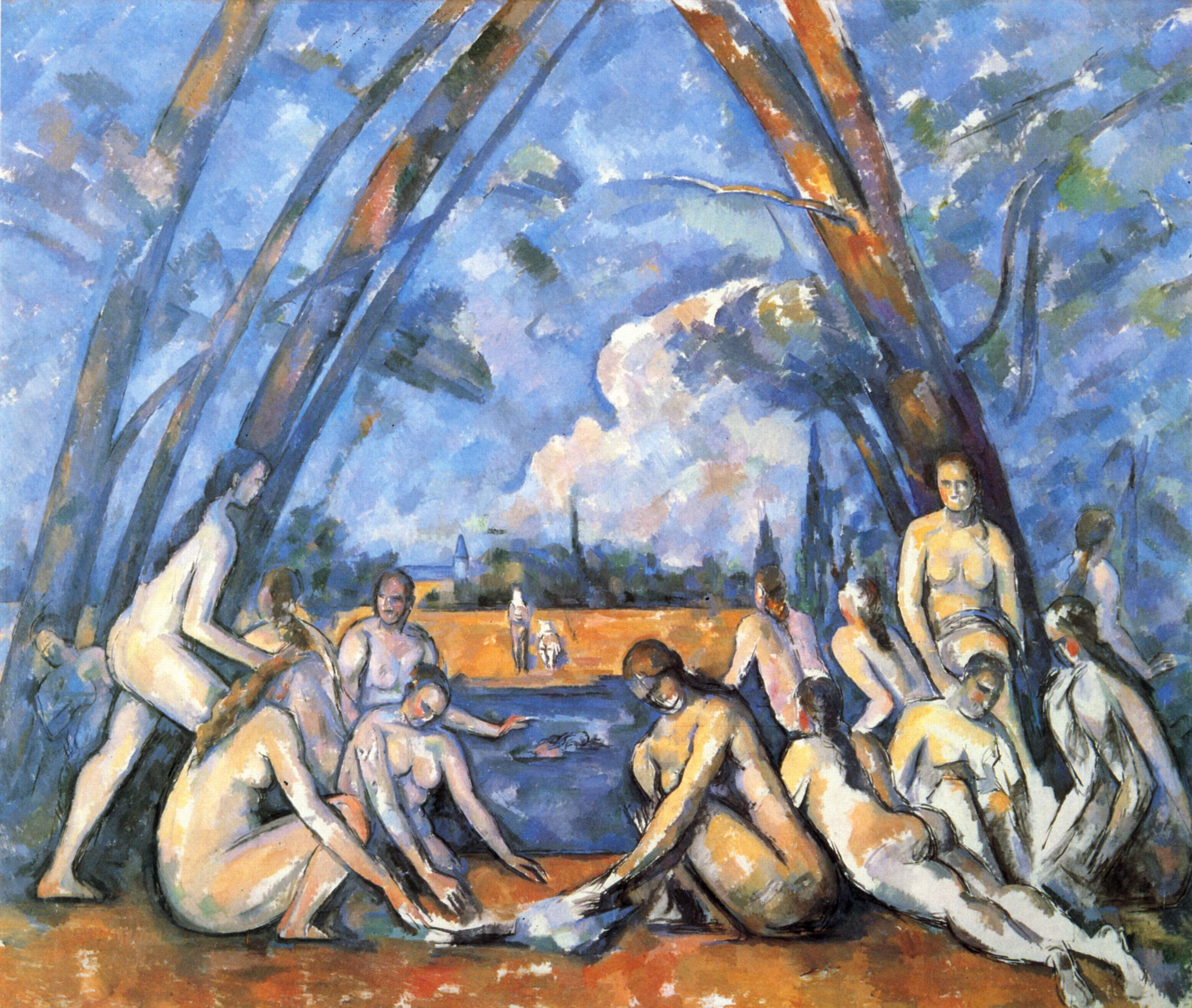
Paul Cézanne's Les Grandes Baigneuses (1906, oil on canvas, 210.5 × 250.8 cm., 82 7/8 × 98 3/4 inches, Philadelphia Museum of Art) is generally believed to be a likely inspiration for Les Demoiselles.

The Demoiselles is generally referred to as the first Cubist picture. This is an exaggeration, for although it was a major first step towards Cubism it is not yet Cubist. The disruptive, expressionist element in it is even contrary to the spirit of Cubism, which looked at the world in a detached, realistic spirit. Nevertheless, the Demoiselles is the logical picture to take as the starting point for Cubism, because it marks the birth of a new pictorial idiom, because in it Picasso violently overturned established conventions and because all that followed grew out of it.

Although not well known to the general public prior to 1906, Cézanne's reputation was highly regarded in avant-garde circles, as evidenced by Ambroise Vollard's interest in showing and collecting his work, and by Leo Stein's interest. Picasso was familiar with much of Cézanne's work that he saw at Vollard's gallery and at the Stein's. After Cézanne died in 1906, his paintings were exhibited in Paris in a large scale museum-like retrospective in September 1907. The 1907 Cézanne retrospective at the Salon d'Automne greatly impacted the direction that the avant-garde in Paris took, lending credence to his position as one of the most influential artists of the 19th century and to the advent of Cubism. The 1907 Cézanne exhibition was enormously influential in establishing Cézanne as an important painter whose ideas were particularly resonant especially to young artists in Paris.

Both Picasso and Braque found the inspiration for their proto-Cubist works in Paul Cézanne, who said to observe and learn to see and treat nature as if it were composed of basic shapes like cubes, spheres, cylinders, and cones. Cézanne's explorations of geometric simplification and optical phenomena inspired Picasso, Braque, Metzinger, Gleizes, Robert Delaunay, Le Fauconnier, Gris and others to experiment with ever more complex multiple views of the same subject, and, eventually to the fracturing of form. Cézanne thus sparked one of the most revolutionary areas of artistic enquiry of the 20th century, one which was to affect profoundly the development of modern art.

=== Gauguin and Primitivism ===
Paul Gauguin, The Moon and the Earth (Hina tefatou), (1893), Museum of Modern Art, New York City

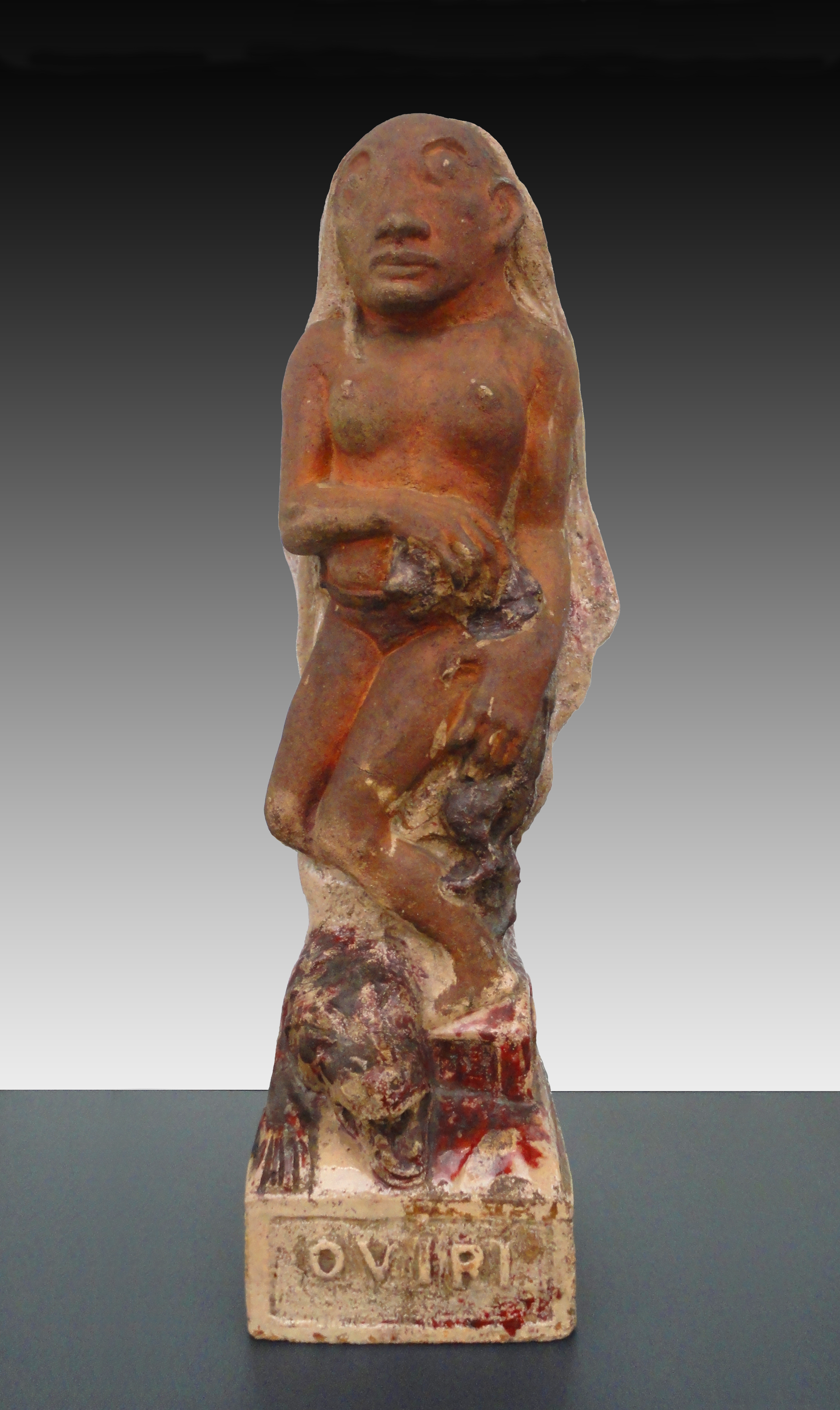
Gauguin, 1894, Oviri (Sauvage), partially glazed stoneware, 75 × 19 × 27 cm, Musée d'Orsay, Paris

Pablo Picasso's paintings of monumental figures from 1906 were directly influenced by Gauguin. The savage power evoked by Gauguin's work led directly to Les Demoiselles in 1907.

During the late 19th and early 20th centuries, the European cultural elite were discovering African, Oceanic and Native American art. Artists such as Paul Gauguin, Henri Matisse and Picasso were intrigued and inspired by the stark power and simplicity of styles of those cultures. Around 1906, Picasso, Matisse, Derain and other artists in Paris had acquired an interest in primitivism, Iberian sculpture, African art and tribal masks, in part because of the compelling works of Paul Gauguin that had suddenly achieved center stage in the avant-garde circles of Paris. Gauguin's powerful posthumous retrospective exhibitions at the Salon d'Automne in Paris in 1903 and an even larger one in 1906 had a stunning and powerful influence on Picasso's paintings.

In the autumn of 1906, Picasso followed his previous successes with paintings of oversized nude women, and monumental sculptural figures that recalled the work of Paul Gauguin and showed his interest in primitive art. Pablo Picasso's paintings of massive figures from 1906 were directly influenced by Gauguin's sculpture, painting and his writing as well.

According to Gauguin biographer David Sweetman, Pablo Picasso as early as 1902 became an aficionado of Gauguin's work when he met and befriended the expatriate Spanish sculptor and ceramist Paco Durrio, in Paris. Durrio had several of Gauguin's works on hand because he was a friend of Gauguin's and an unpaid agent of his work. Durrio tried to help his poverty-stricken friend in Tahiti by promoting his oeuvre in Paris. After they met Durrio introduced Picasso to Gauguin's stoneware, helped Picasso make some ceramic pieces and gave Picasso a first La Plume edition of Noa Noa: The Tahiti Journal of Paul Gauguin.

Concerning Gauguin's impact on Picasso, art historian John Richardson wrote,

The 1906 exhibition of Gauguin's work left Picasso more than ever in this artist's thrall. Gauguin demonstrated the most disparate types of art—not to speak of elements from metaphysics, ethnology, symbolism, the Bible, classical myths, and much else besides—could be combined into a synthesis that was of its time yet timeless. An artist could also confound conventional notions of beauty, he demonstrated, by harnessing his demons to the dark gods (not necessarily Tahitian ones) and tapping a new source of divine energy. If in later years Picasso played down his debt to Gauguin, there is no doubt that between 1905 and 1907 he felt a very close kinship with this other Paul, who prided himself on Spanish genes inherited from his Peruvian grandmother. Had not Picasso signed himself 'Paul' in Gauguin's honor.

Both David Sweetman and John Richardson point to Gauguin's Oviri (literally meaning 'savage'), a gruesome phallic representation of the Tahitian goddess of life and death intended for Gauguin's grave. First exhibited in the 1906 retrospective, it was likely a direct influence on Les Demoiselles. Sweetman writes,

Gauguin's statue Oviri, which was prominently displayed in 1906, was to stimulate Picasso's interest in both sculpture and ceramics, while the woodcuts would reinforce his interest in print-making, though it was the element of the primitive in all of them which most conditioned the direction that Picasso's art would take. This interest would culminate in the seminal Les Demoiselles d'Avignon.

According to Richardson,

Picasso's interest in stoneware was further stimulated by the examples he saw at the 1906 Gauguin retrospective at the Salon d'Automne. The most disturbing of those ceramics (one that Picasso might have already seen at Vollard's) was the gruesome Oviri. Until 1987, when the Musée d'Orsay acquired this little-known work (exhibited only once since 1906) it had never been recognized as the masterpiece it is, let alone recognized for its relevance to the works leading up to the Demoiselles. Although just under 30 inches high, Oviri has an awesome presence, as befits a monument intended for Gauguin's grave. Picasso was very struck by Oviri. 50 years later he was delighted when [Douglas] Cooper and I told him that we had come upon this sculpture in a collection that also included the original plaster of his Cubist head. Has it been a revelation, like Iberian sculpture? Picasso's shrug was grudgingly affirmative. He was always loath to admit Gauguin's role in setting him on the road to primitivism.

=== African and Iberian art ===
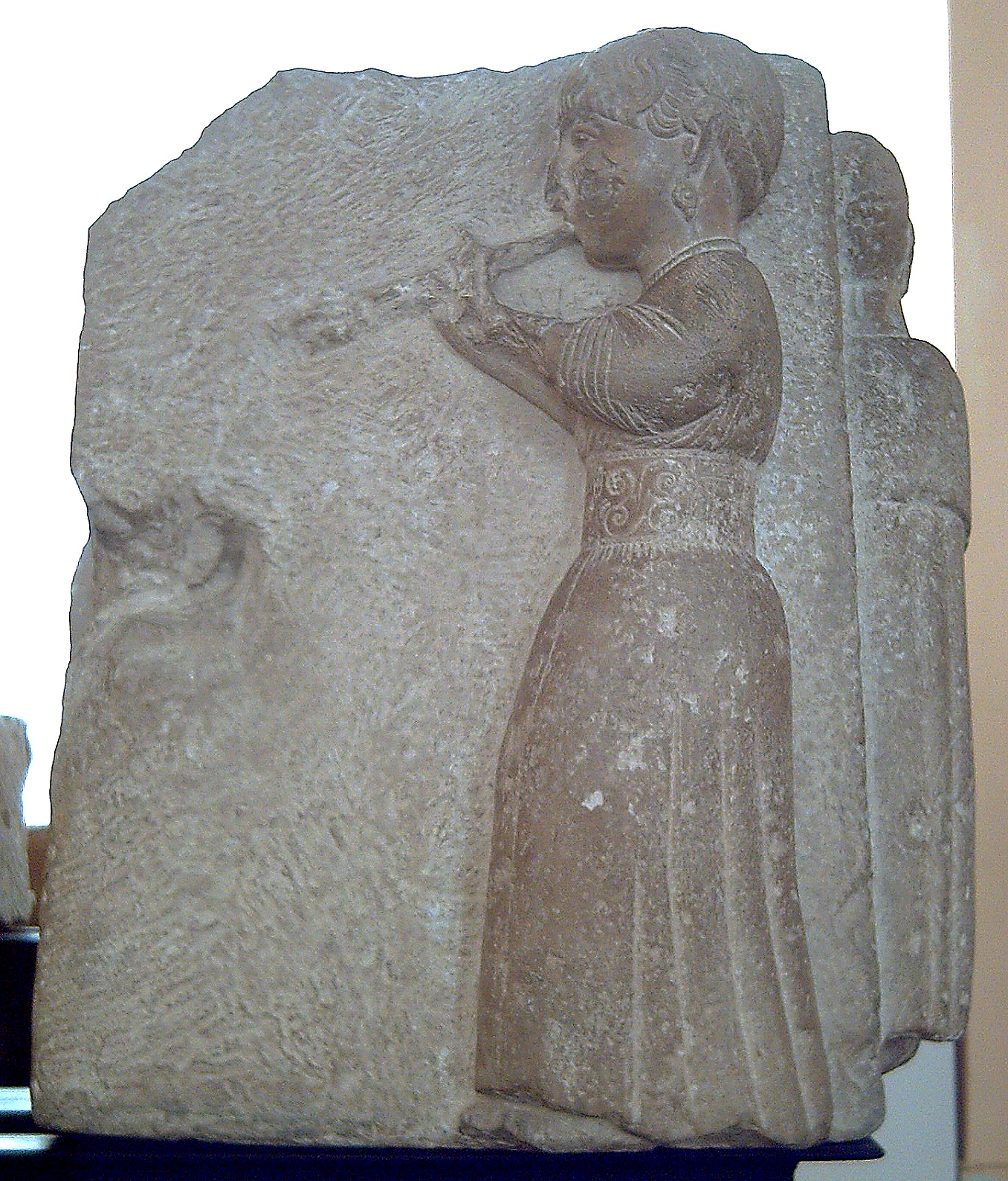
Female musician from the "Relief of Osuna", Iberian, ca. 200 BC

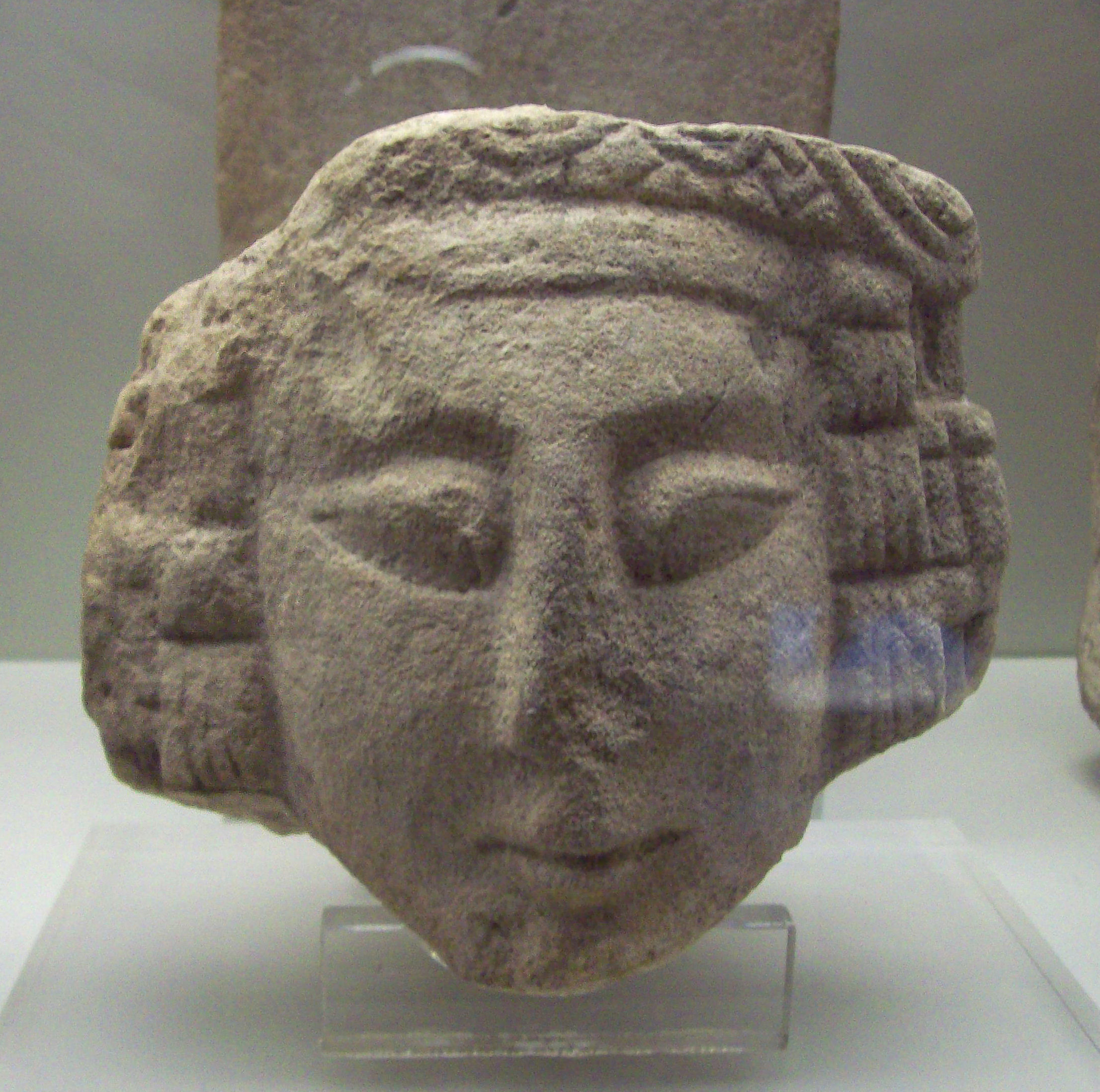
Iberian female sculpture from 3rd or 2nd century BC

This style influenced Les Demoiselles d'Avignon.

During the 19th and 20th centuries, Europe's colonization of Africa led to many economic, social, political, and even artistic encounters. From these encounters, Western visual artists became increasingly interested in the unique forms of African art, particularly masks from the Niger-Congo region. In an essay by Dennis Duerden, author of African Art (1968), The Invisible Present (1972), and a former director of the BBC World Service, the mask is defined as "very often a complete head-dress and not just that part that conceals the face". This form of visual art and image appealed to Western visual artists, leading to what Duerden calls the "discovery" of African art by Western practitioners, including Picasso, for example at the 1907 Colonial Exhibition in Paris.

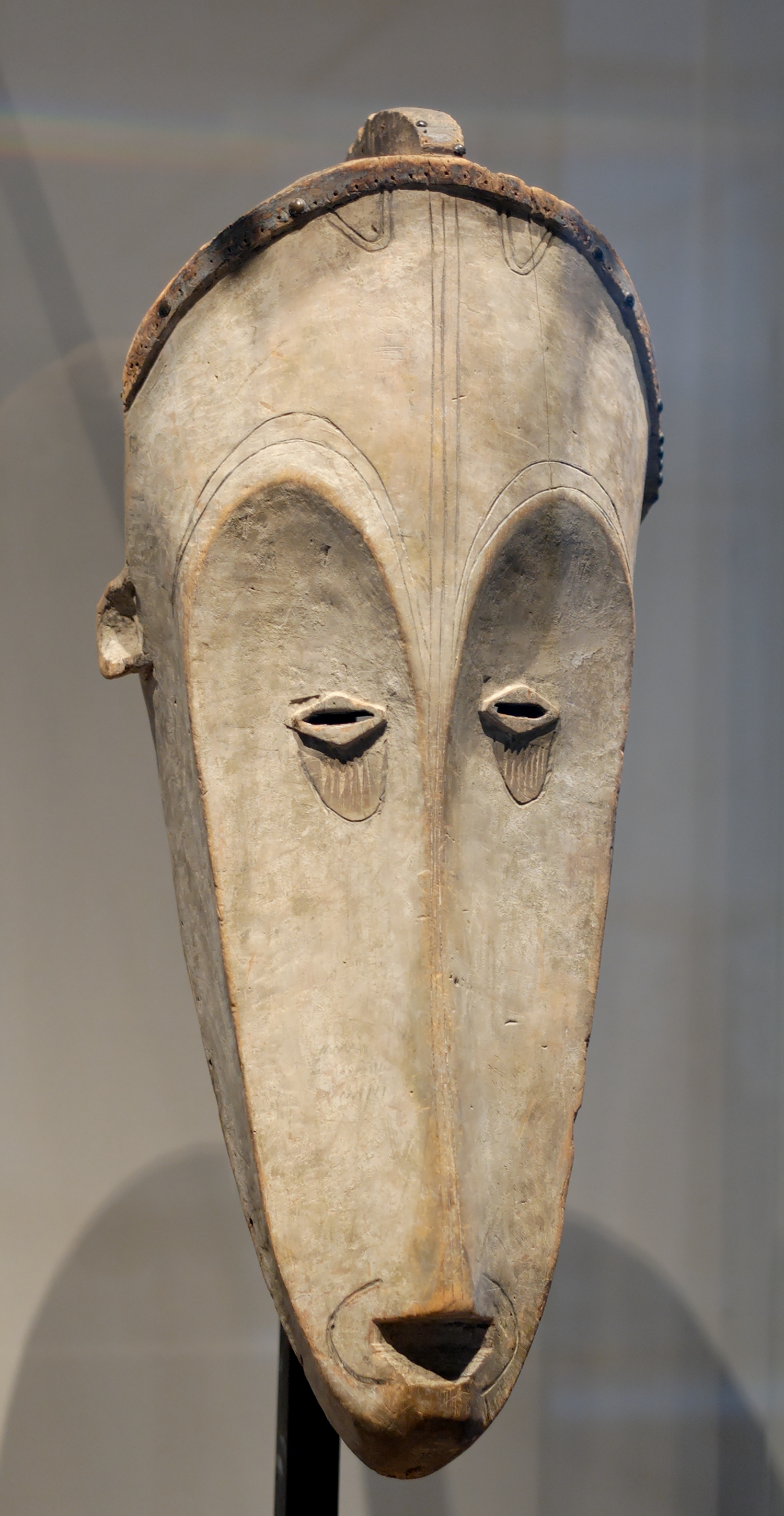
African Fang mask similar in style to those Picasso saw in Paris just prior to painting Les Demoiselles d'Avignon

The stylistic sources for the heads of the women and their degree of influence has been much discussed and debated, in particular the influence of African tribal masks, art of Oceania, and pre-Roman Iberian sculptures. The rounded contours of the features of the three women to the left can be related to Iberian sculpture, but not obviously the fragmented planes of the two on the right, which indeed seem influenced by African masks. Lawrence Weschler says that,

in many ways, much of the moldering cultural and even scientific ferment that characterized the first decade and a half of the twentieth century and that laid the foundations for much of what we today consider modern can be traced back to ways in which Europe was already wrestling with its bad-faith, often strenuously repressed, knowledge of what it had been doing in Africa. The example of Picasso virtually launching cubism with his 1907 Demoiselles d'Avignon, in response to the sorts of African masks and other colonial booty he was encountering in Paris's Musee de l'Homme, is obvious.

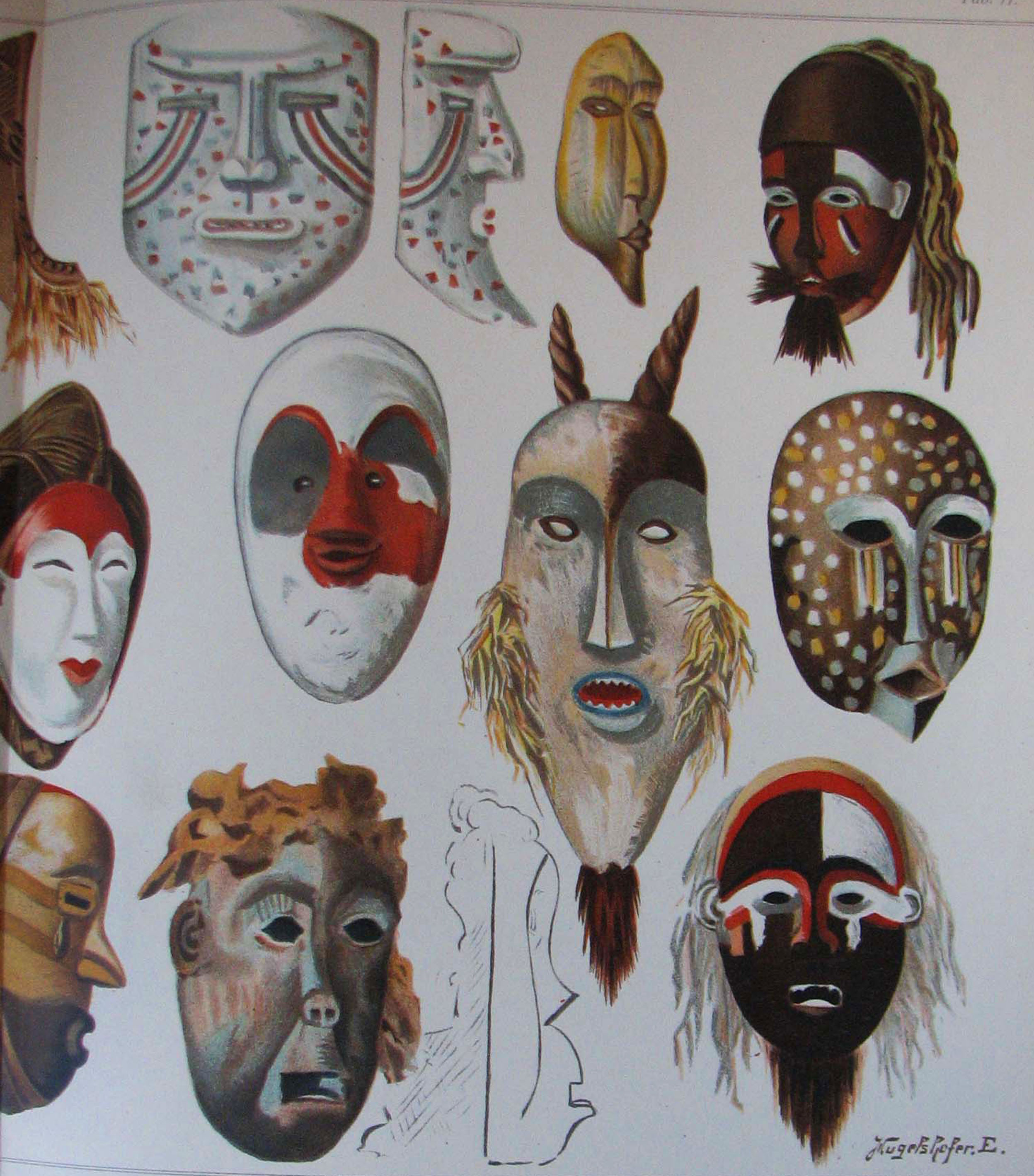
Congo masks published by Leo Frobenius in his 1898 book Die Masken und Geheimbunde Afrika

Private collections and illustrated books featuring African art in this period were also important. While Picasso emphatically denied the influence of African masks on the painting: "African art? Never heard of it!" (L'art nègre? Connais pas!), this is belied by his deep interest in the African sculptures owned by Matisse and his close friend Guiliaume Apollinaire. Since none of the African masks once thought to have influenced Picasso in this painting were available in Paris at the time work was painted, he is thought now to have studied African mask forms in an illustrated volume by anthropologist Leo Frobenius. Primitivism continues in his work during, before and after the painting of Les Demoiselles d'Avignon, from spring 1906 through the spring of 1907. Influences from ancient Iberian sculpture are also important. Some Iberian reliefs from Osuna, then only recently excavated, were on display in the Louvre from 1904. Archaic Greek sculpture has also been claimed as an influence.

Contentions about the influence of African sculpture were fueled in 1939 when Alfred Barr said the primitivism of the Demoiselles derived from the art of Côte d'Ivoire and the French Congo. Picasso subsequently insisted his catalogue raissonne's editor Christian Zervos publish a disclaimer in which Picasso certified that he was not aware of African art until after Demoiselles was completed, but that he had instead drawn from Iberian art he had seen a year or so earlier, in particular from the Louvre's Osuna reliefs. Contradictingly, in 1944 Picasso recounted seeing African art and being greatly moved by it during Demoiselles' creation, adding that the experience was revelatory and a pivotal moment in the painting's formulation. To Andre Malraux he said the revelations of African sculpture came to him from visiting to the Ethnographic Museum of the Trocadero. As Picasso recalled, "When I went to the Trocadero, it was disgusting. The flea market, the smell. I was all alone. I wanted to get away, but I didn't leave. I stayed, I stayed. I understood that it was very important. Something was happening to me, right. The masks weren't like any other pieces of sculpture, not at all. They were magic things." Maurice de Vlaminck is often credited with introducing Picasso to African sculpture of Fang extraction in 1904.

Picasso biographer John Richardson recounts in A Life of Picasso, The Cubist Rebel 1907–1916 art dealer Daniel-Henry Kahnweiler's recollection of his first visit to Picasso's studio in July 1907. Kahnweiler remembers seeing "dusty stacks of canvases" in Picasso's studio and "African sculptures of majestic severity". Richardson comments: "so much for Picasso's story that he was not yet aware of Tribal art.'" A photograph of Picasso in his studio surrounded by African sculptures c.1908, is found on page 27 of that same volume.

Suzanne Preston Blier says that, like Gauguin and several other artists in this era, Picasso used illustrated books for many of his preliminary studies for this painting. In addition to the Frobenius book, his sources included a 1906 publication of a twelfth-century Medieval art manuscript on architectural sculpture by Villiard de Honnecourt and a book by Carl Heinrich Stratz of pseudo-pornography showing photos and drawings of women from around the world organized to evoke ideas of human origins and evolution. Blier suggests that this helps account for the diversity of styles Picasso employed in his image-filled sketchbooks for this painting. These books, and other sources such as cartoons, Blier writes, also offer hints as to the larger meaning of this painting.

=== Mathematics ===
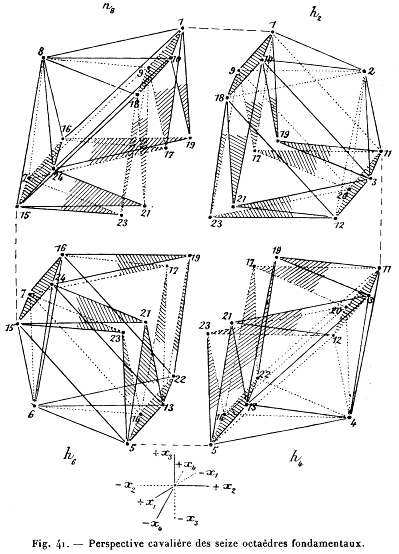
An illustration from Jouffret's Traité élémentaire de géométrie à quatre dimensions. The book, which influenced Picasso, was given to him by Princet.

Maurice Princet, a French mathematician and actuary, played a role in the birth of Cubism as an associate of Pablo Picasso, Guillaume Apollinaire, Max Jacob, Jean Metzinger, Robert Delaunay, Juan Gris and later Marcel Duchamp. Princet became known as "le mathématicien du cubisme" ("the mathematician of cubism").

Princet is credited with introducing the work of Henri Poincaré and the concept of the "fourth dimension" to artists at the Bateau-Lavoir. Princet brought to the attention of Picasso, Metzinger and others, a book by Esprit Jouffret, Traité élémentaire de géométrie à quatre dimensions (Elementary Treatise on the Geometry of Four Dimensions, 1903), a popularization of Poincaré's Science and Hypothesis in which Jouffret described hypercubes and other complex polyhedra in four dimensions and projected them onto the two-dimensional surface. Picasso's sketchbooks for Les Demoiselles d'Avignon illustrate Jouffret's influence on the artist's work.

== Impact ==
Although Les Demoiselles had an enormous and profound influence on modern art, its impact was not immediate, and the painting stayed in Picasso's studio for many years. At first, only Picasso's intimate circle of artists, dealers, collectors and friends were aware of the work. Soon after the late summer of 1907, Picasso and his long-time lover Fernande Olivier (1881–1966) separated. The re-painting of the two heads on the far right of Les Demoiselles fueled speculation that it was an indication of the split between Picasso and Olivier. Although they later reunited for a period, the relationship ended in 1912.

A photograph of the Les Demoiselles was first published in an article by Gelett Burgess entitled "The Wild Men of Paris, Matisse, Picasso and Les Fauves", The Architectural Record, May 1910.

Les Demoiselles would not be exhibited until 1916, and not widely recognized as a revolutionary achievement until the early 1920s, when André Breton (1896–1966) published the work. The painting was reproduced again in Cahiers d'art (1927), within an article dedicated to African art.

Richardson goes on to say that Matisse was irate upon seeing the Demoiselles at Picasso's studio. He let it be known that he regarded the painting as an attempt to ridicule the modern movement; he was outraged to find his sensational Blue Nude, not to speak of Bonheur de vivre, overtaken by Picasso's "hideous" whores. He vowed to get even and make Picasso beg for mercy. Just as the Bonheur de vivre had fueled Picasso's competitiveness, Les Demoiselles now fueled Matisse's.

Among Picasso's closed circle of friends and colleagues there was a mixture of opinions about Les Demoiselles. Georges Braque and André Derain were both initially troubled by it although they were supportive of Picasso. According to William Rubin, two of Picasso's friends, the art critic André Salmon and the painter Ardengo Soffici (1879–1964), were enthusiastic about it while Guillaume Apollinaire (1880–1918) was not. Both the art dealer-collector Wilhelm Uhde (1874–1947), and Kahnweiler were more enthusiastic about the painting however.

According to Kahnweiler Les Demoiselles was the beginning of Cubism. He writes:

Early in 1907 Picasso began a strange large painting depicting women, fruit and drapery, which he left unfinished. It cannot be called other than unfinished, even though it represents a long period of work. Begun in the spirit of the works of 1906, it contains in one section the endeavors of 1907 and thus never constitutes a unified whole.

The nudes, with large, quiet eyes, stand rigid, like mannequins. Their stiff, round bodies are flesh-colored, black and white. That is the style of 1906.

In the foreground, however, alien to the style of the rest of the painting, appear a crouching figure and a bowl of fruit. These forms are drawn angularly, not roundly modeled in chiaroscuro. The colors are luscious blue, strident yellow, next to pure black and white. This is the beginning of Cubism, the first upsurge, a desperate titanic clash with all of the problems at once.

— Kahnweiler, 1920

== Public view and title ==
From 16 to 31 July 1916 Les Demoiselles was exhibited to the public for the first time at the Salon d'Antin, an exhibition organized by André Salmon titled L'Art moderne en France. The exhibition space at 26 rue d'Antin was lent by the famous couturier and art collector Paul Poiret. The larger Salon d'Automne and Salon des Indépendants had been closed due to World War I, making this the only Cubists' exhibition in France since 1914. On 23 July 1916 a review was published in Le Cri de Paris:

The Cubists are not waiting for the war to end to recommence hostilities against good sense. They are exhibiting at the Galerie Poiret naked women whose scattered parts are represented in all four corners of the canvas: here an eye, there an ear, over there a hand, a foot on top, a mouth below. M. Picasso, their leader, is possibly the least disheveled of the lot. He has painted, or rather daubed, five women who are, if the truth be told, all hacked up, and yet their limbs somehow manage to hold together. They have, moreover, piggish faces with eyes wandering negligently above their ears. An enthusiastic art-lover offered the artist 20,000 francs for this masterpiece. M. Picasso wanted more. The art-lover did not insist.

Picasso referred to his only entry at the Salon d'Antin as his Brothel painting calling it Le Bordel d'Avignon but André Salmon who had originally labeled the work, Le Bordel Philosophique, retitled it Les Demoiselles d'Avignon so as to lessen its scandalous impact on the public. Picasso never liked the title, however, preferring "las chicas de Avignon", but Salmon's title stuck. Leo Steinberg labels his essays on the painting after its original title. According to Suzanne Preston Blier, the word bordel in the painting's title, rather than evoking a house of prostitution (une maison close) instead more accurately references in French a complex situation or mess. This painting, Blier says, explores not prostitution per se, but instead sex and motherhood more generally, along with the complexities of evolution in the colonial multi-racial world. The name Avignon, scholars argue, not only references the street where Picasso once bought his paint supplies (which had a few brothels), but also the home of Max Jacob's grandmother, whom Picasso jocularly identifies as one of the painting's diverse modern day subjects.

The only other time the painting might have been exhibited to the public prior to a 1937 showing in New York was in 1918, in an exhibition dedicated to Picasso and Matisse at Galerie Paul Guillaume in Paris, though very little information exists about this exhibition or the presence (if at all) of Les Demoiselles.

Afterwards, the painting was rolled up and remained with Picasso until 1924 when, with urging and help from Breton and Louis Aragon (1897–1982), he sold it to designer Jacques Doucet (1853–1929), for 25,000 francs.

Between September 1984 and January 1985, Les Demoiselles was displayed in an exhibition entitled "Primitivism" in 20th Century Art: Affinity of the Tribal and the Modern at the Museum of Modern Art in New York City. The exhibition displayed modern pieces by artists such as Henri Matisse, Paul Gauguin and Pablo Picasso alongside artifacts from tribal groups from Africa, Oceania and North America in order to reveal how modern artists have interpreted tribal art. The display of this painting among African tribal masks was intended to correlate the masks as the inspiration for the features Picasso painted on the women in Les Demoiselles.

The exhibition's catalogue states that the pejorative ethnographic and political connotations of 'primitivism' were not the lens of the exhibition's curation. Nevertheless, the exhibition was controversial, as some critics believed it exemplified western intrigue with the 'different' and the harmful notion that Western culture is the modern and 'ideal' future. The museum's attempt to remove the implication of the title's vocabulary was critiqued as false innocence by critics who said the exhibition framed tribal culture as foreign and 'different' symbolism and treated tribal objects solely a part of history whose only modern purpose is to serve artistic interpretation.

== Interpretation ==
Pablo Picasso, Head of a Sleeping Woman (Study for Nude with Drapery), 1907, oil on canvas, 61.4 × 47.6 cm, The Museum of Modern Art, New York

Picasso drew each of the figures in Les Demoiselles differently. The woman pulling the curtain on the upper right is rendered with heavy paint. Composed of sharp geometric shapes, her head is the most strictly Cubist of all five. The curtain seems to blend partially into her body. The Cubist head of the crouching figure (lower right) underwent at least two revisions from an Iberian figure to its current state. She also seems to have been drawn from two different perspectives at once, creating a confusing, twisted figure. The woman above her is rather manly, with a dark face and square chest. The whole picture is in a two-dimensional style, with an abandoned perspective.

Pablo Picasso, Les Demoiselles d'Avignon, detail of the figure to the upper right

Pablo Picasso, Les Demoiselles d'Avignon, detail of the figure to the lower right

Pablo Picasso, Nu aux bras levés (Nude), 1907

Pablo Picasso, 1907, Nu à la serviette, oil on canvas, 116 x 89 cm

Pablo Picasso, 1907, Femme nue, oil on canvas, 92 x 43 cm, Museo delle Culture, Milano

Much of the critical debate that has taken place over the years centers on attempting to account for this multiplicity of styles within the work. The dominant understanding for over five decades, espoused most notably by Alfred Barr, the first director of the Museum of Modern Art in New York City and organizer of major career retrospectives for the artist, has been that it can be interpreted as evidence of a transitional period in Picasso's art, an effort to connect his earlier work to Cubism, the style he would help invent and develop over the next five or six years. Suzanne Preston Blier says that the divergent styles of the painting were added intentionally to convey to each women art "style" attributes from the five geographic areas each woman represents.

Art critic John Berger, in his controversial 1965 biography The Success and Failure of Picasso, interprets Les Demoiselles d'Avignon as the provocation that led to Cubism:

Blunted by the insolence of so much recent art, we probably tend to underestimate the brutality of the Les Demoiselles d'Avignon. All his friends who saw it in his studio were at first shocked by it. And it was meant to shock...

A brothel may not in itself be shocking. But women painted without charm or sadness, without irony or social comment, women painted like the palings of a stockade through eyes that look out as if at death – that is shocking. And equally the method of painting. Picasso himself has said that he was influenced at the time by archaic Spanish (Iberian) sculpture. He was also influenced – particularly in the two heads at the right – by African masks...here it seems that Picasso's quotations are simple, direct, and emotional. He is not in the least concerned with formal problems. The dislocations in this picture are the result of aggression, not aesthetics; it is the nearest you can get in a painting to an outrage...

I emphasize the violent and iconoclastic aspect of this painting because it is usually enshrined as the great formal exercise which was the starting point of Cubism. It was the starting point of Cubism, in so far as it prompted Braque to begin painting at the end of the year his own far more formal answer to Les Demoiselles d'Avignon...yet if he had been left to himself, this picture would never have led Picasso to Cubism or to any way of painting remotely resembling it...It has nothing to do with that twentieth-century vision of the future which was the essence of Cubism.

Yet it did provoke the beginning of the great period of exception in Picasso's life. Nobody can know exactly how the change began inside Picasso. We can only note the results. Les Demoiselles d'Avignon, unlike any previous painting by Picasso, offers no evidence of skill. On the contrary, it is clumsy, overworked, unfinished. It is as though his fury in painting it was so great that it destroyed his gifts...

By painting Les Demoiselles d'Avignon Picasso provoked Cubism. It was the spontaneous and, as always, primitive insurrection out of which, for good historical reasons, the revolution of Cubism developed.

Art historian and professor Anna C. Chave agrees with Berger that Les Demoiselles d'Avignon can be taken as the catalyst for the style of Cubism in her 1994 article, New Encounters with Les Demoiselles d'Avignon: Gender, Race, and the Origins of Cubism. Chave also gives an interesting new perspective on the piece in her article, that of a woman, which stands in stark contrast to the numerous other reviews of the painting provided by men. Additionally, her article focuses not only on the work itself but also on the critiques and assessments of it that have emerged in the decades since it was initially displayed, prompting readers to think deeply about what reactions to the painting say about viewers and society at large.

In 1972, art critic Leo Steinberg in his essay The Philosophical Brothel posited a wholly different explanation for the wide range of stylistic attributes. Using the earlier sketches—which had been ignored by most critics—he argued that far from evidence of an artist undergoing a rapid stylistic metamorphosis, the variety of styles can be read as a deliberate attempt, a careful plan, to capture the gaze of the viewer. He notes that the five women all seem eerily disconnected, indeed wholly unaware of each other. Rather, they focus solely on the viewer, their divergent styles only furthering the intensity of their glare.

The earliest sketches feature two men inside the brothel; a sailor and a medical student (who was often depicted holding either a book or a skull, causing Barr and others to read the painting as a memento mori, a reminder of death). A trace of their presence at a table in the center remains: the jutting edge of a table near the bottom of the canvas. The viewer, Steinberg says, has come to replace the sitting men, forced to confront the gaze of prostitutes head on, invoking readings far more complex than a simple allegory or the autobiographical reading that attempts to understand the work in relation to Picasso's own history with women. A world of meanings then becomes possible, suggesting the work as a meditation on the danger of sex, the "trauma of the gaze" (to use a phrase of Rosalind Krauss's invention), and the threat of violence inherent in the scene and sexual relations at large.

According to Steinberg, the reversed gaze, that is, the fact that the figures look directly at the viewer, as well as the idea of the self-possessed woman, no longer there solely for the pleasure of the male gaze, may be traced back to Édouard Manet's Olympia of 1863. William Rubin (1927–2006), the former director of the Department of Painting and Sculpture at MoMA wrote that "Steinberg was the first writer to come to grips with the sexual subject of the Demoiselles."

A few years after writing The Philosophical Brothel, Steinberg wrote further about the revolutionary nature of Les Demoiselles:

Picasso was resolved to undo the continuities of form and field which Western art had so long taken for granted. The famous stylistic rupture at right turned out to be merely a consummation. Overnight, the contrived coherences of representational art - the feigned unities of time and place, the stylistic consistencies - all were declared to be fictional. The Demoiselles confessed itself a picture conceived in duration and delivered in spasms. In this one work Picasso discovered that the demands of discontinuity could be met on multiple levels: by cleaving depicted flesh; by elision of limbs and abbreviation; by slashing the web of connecting space; by abrupt changes of vantage; and by a sudden stylistic shift at the climax. Finally, the insistent staccato of the presentation was found to intensify the picture's address and symbolic charge: the beholder, instead of observing a roomfuI of lazing whores, is targeted from all sides. So far from suppressing the subject, the mode of organization heightens its flagrant eroticism.

At the end of the first volume of his four volume Picasso biography: A Life Of Picasso. The Prodigy, 1881–1906, John Richardson comments on Les Demoiselles. Richardson says:

It is at this point, the beginning of 1907, that I propose to bring this first volume to an end. The 25-year-old Picasso is about to conjure up a quintet of Dionysiac Demoiselles on his huge new canvas. The execution of this painting would make a dramatic climax to these pages. However, it would imply that Picasso's great revolutionary work constitutes a conclusion to all that has gone before. It does not. For all that the Demoiselles is rooted in Picasso's past, not to speak of such precursors as the Iron Age Iberians, El Greco, Gauguin and Cézanne, it is essentially a beginning: the most innovative painting since Giotto. As we will see in the next volume, it established a new pictorial syntax; it enabled people to perceive things with new eyes, new minds, new awareness. Les Demoiselles d'Avignon is the first unequivocally 20th-century masterpiece, a principal detonator of the modern movement, the cornerstone of 20th-century art. For Picasso it would also be a rite of passage: what he called an exorcism.' It cleared the way for cubism. It likewise banished the artist's demons. Later, these demons would return and require further exorcism. For the next decade, however, Picasso would feel as free and creative and 'as overworked' as God.

Suzanne Preston Blier addresses the history and meaning of Les Demoiselles d'Avignon in a 2019 book in a different way, one that draws on her African art expertise and an array of newly discovered sources she unearthed. Blier addresses the painting not as a simple bordello scene but as Picasso's interpretation of the diversity of women from around the world that Picasso encountered in part through photographs and sculptures seen in illustrated books. These representations, Blier argues, are central to understanding the painting's creation and help identify the demoiselles as global figures – mothers, grandmothers, lovers, and sisters, living the colonial world Picasso inhabited. She says that Picasso has reunited these diverse women together in this strange cave-like (and womb-resembling) setting as a kind of global "time machine" – each woman referencing a different era, place of origins, and concomitant artistic style, as part of the broader "ages of man" theme important to the new century, in which core themes of evolution took on an increasingly important role. The two men (a sailor and a doctor) depicted in some of the painting's earlier preparatory drawings, Blier suggests, likely represent the male authors of two of the illustrated books that Picasso employed – the anthropologist Leo Frobenius as sailor, one travels the world to. explore various ports of call and the Vienna medical doctor, Karl Heinrich Stratz who holds a human skull or book consistent with the detailed anatomical studies that he provides.

Blier is able to date the painting to late March 1907 directly following the opening of the Salon des Independents where Matisse and Derain had exhibited their own bold, emotionally charged "origins"-themed tableaux. The large scale of the canvas, Blier says, complements the important scientific and historical theme. The reunion of the mothers of each "race" within this human evolutionary framework, Blier maintains, also constitutes the larger "philosophy" behind the painting's original le bordel philosophique title – evoking the potent "mess" and "complex situation" (le bordel) that Picasso was exploring in this work. In contrast to Leo Steinberg and William Rubin who argued that Picasso had effaced the two right hand demoiselles to repaint their faces with African masks in response to a crisis stemming from larger fears of death or women, an early photograph of the painting in Picasso's studio, Blier shows, indicates that the artist had portrayed African masks on these women from the outset consistent with their identities as progenitors of these races. Blier argues that the painting was largely completed in a single night following a debate about philosophy with friends at a local Paris brasserie.

== Purchase ==
Jacques Doucet's hôtel particulier, 33 rue Saint-James, Neuilly-sur-Seine, 1929 photograph Pierre Legrain

Jacques Doucet had seen the painting at the Salon d'Antin, yet remarkably seems to have purchased Les Demoiselles without asking Picasso to unroll it in his studio so that he could see it again. André Breton later described the transaction:

I remember the day he bought the painting from Picasso, who strange as it may seem, appeared to be intimidated by Doucet and even offered no resistance when the price was set at 25,000 francs: "Well then, it's agreed, M. Picasso." Doucet then said: "You shall receive 2,000 francs per month, beginning next month, until the sum of 25,000 francs is reached.

John Richardson quotes Breton in a letter to Doucet about Les Demoiselles writing:

through it one penetrates right into the core of Picasso's laboratory and because it is the crux of the drama, the center of all the conflicts that Picasso has given rise to and that will last forever....It is a work which to my mind transcends painting; it is the theater of everything that has happened in the last 50 years.

Ultimately, it seems Doucet paid 30,000 francs rather than the agreed price. A few months after the purchase Doucet had the painting appraised at between 250,000 and 300,000 francs. Richardson speculates that Picasso, who by 1924 was on the top of the art world and did not need to sell the painting to Doucet, did so and at that low price because Doucet promised Les Demoiselles would go to the Louvre in his will. However, after Doucet died in 1929 he did not leave the painting to the Louvre in his will, and it was sold like most of Doucet's collection through private dealers.

In November 1937 the Jacques Seligman & Co. art gallery in New York City held an exhibition titled "20 Years in the Evolution of Picasso, 1903–1923" that included Les Demoiselles. The Museum of Modern Art acquired the painting for $24,000. The museum raised $18,000 toward the purchase price by selling a Degas painting and the rest came from donations from the co-owners of the gallery Germain Seligman and Cesar de Hauke.

The Museum of Modern Art in New York City mounted an important Picasso exhibition on 15 November 1939 that remained on view until 7 January 1940. The exhibition, entitled Picasso: 40 Years of His Art, was organized by Alfred H. Barr (1902–1981), in collaboration with the Art Institute of Chicago. The exhibition contained 344 works, including the major 1937 painting Guernica and its studies, as well as Les Demoiselles.

== Legacy ==
In July 2007, Newsweek published a two-page article about Les Demoiselles d'Avignon describing it as the "most influential work of art of the last 100 years". Art critic Holland Cotter argued that Picasso "changed history with this work. He'd replaced the benign ideal of the Classical nude with a new race of sexually armed and dangerous beings."

The painting is prominently featured in the 1993 Steve Martin play Picasso at the Lapin Agile, about a fictional meeting of the young Picasso and Albert Einstein in a Paris cafe, and in the 2018 season of the television series Genius, which focuses on Picasso's life and work.

== Painting materials ==
In 2003, an examination of the painting by x-ray fluorescence spectroscopy performed by conservators at the Museum of Modern Art confirmed the presence of the pigments lead white, bone black, vermilion, cadmium yellow, cobalt blue, emerald green, and native earth pigments (such as brown ochre) that contain iron.
