= Seascape (Slightly Cloudy) =

Painting by Gerhard Richter

Seascape (Slightly Cloudy) is an oil-on-canvas painting executed in 1969 by German artist Gerhard Richter. It depicts a cloudy sky in grey, white and blue tones over a deep, elongated horizon line and a grey, mirror-smooth surface of the sea. The painting is signed, dated and numbered 239-2 Richter 1969 on the reverse. It his held at the Louis Vuitton Foundation, in Paris.

== History ==
The painting was created in 1969 as the first in the series Seascapes, in which Richter dealt with the subject of the sea, sky and clouds. The painting was auctioned from a German private collection at Sotheby's, in London, in 1993, and reached a price of $457,299. It came up for auction at Christie's in 1998, estimated at $2 million, but didn't found a buyer. It returned to Christie's on May 8, 2012, and was sold for $19,346,500.

The picture was first presented in 1970 as part of the exhibition "Gerhard Richter, Blinky Palermo, Günther Uecker" at the Palais des Beaux-Arts in Brussels, then in 2014 in the inaugural exhibition of the Louis Vuitton Foundation, in Paris, and in 2017 at the National Gallery in Prague.

In this painting, like in the others of the Seascapes series, the depiction of the sky and sea is based on photographs. The last bearing the same name is dated from 1998. These paintings are characterized by a low, long horizon, waves, clouds, haze and fog, breaking light, subtle color effects and smooth brushwork. The Seascapes are constructed images, created on the basis of composite sections from photographs; they do not depict a real landscape. Richter said in an interview in 1982, "the more beautiful, clever, insane and extreme, the more vividly and incomprehensibly they describe this incomprehensible reality in a parable."

Critics and interpreters of this painting see Richter, on the one hand, in the tradition of German Romanticism, above all Caspar David Friedrich, and on the other hand in the tradition of marine painting with its virtuoso depiction of water, air and light, but as the Austrian art historian Alexandra Matzner writes, "he took away the heroic or dramatic narratives of these paintings. Instead, Gerhard Richter's seascapes evoke stillness and a sense of eternity." They stand in the pictorial tradition of the sublime, which confronts man with the eternity of nature and his own finitude.
