= A Seascape. The Coast of the Island of Rügen in Evening Light =

Painting by Johan Christian Dahl

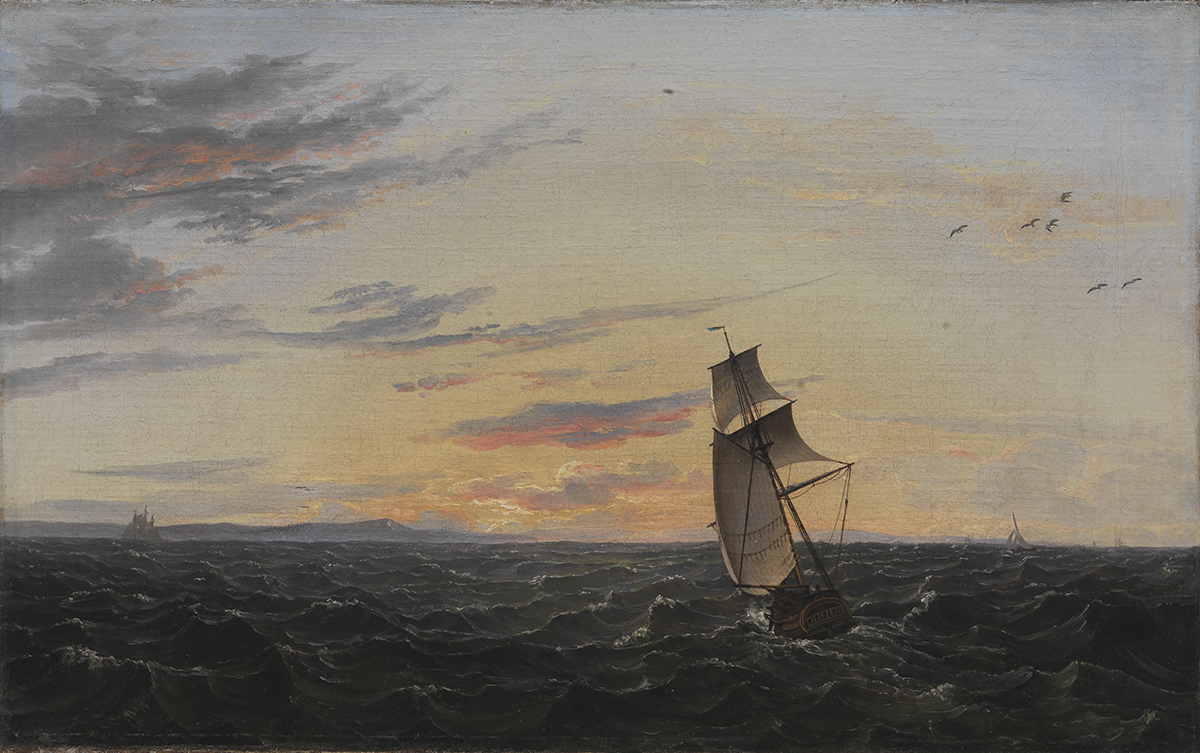
- Artist: Johan Christian Dahl
- Year: 1818
- Type: Oil on canvas, landscape painting
- Dimensions: 37 cm × 58.5 cm (15 in × 23.0 in)
- Location: National Gallery of Denmark, Copenhagen

A Seascape. The Coast of the Island of Rügen in Evening Light (Danish: Et søstykke. Kysterne af Rügen set i aftenrøden efter en stormfuld dag, literally A Seascape: The coast of Rügen seen in evening light after a stormy day) is an oil-on-canvas marine painting by J.C. Dahl, from 1818. It is held in the National Gallery of Denmark, in Copenhagen, which purchased it at auction in 1975. It was his first marine painting and the first work he produced in Dresden. A signed compositional drawing for it is now in the Bergen Kunstmuseum.

The work is based on his eight-day journey from Denmark to Germany. He noted in his diary that a storm had come out of nowhere and not ceased before reaching Rügen, making him seasick throughout the voyage. The work was commissioned by Prince Christian Frederik in 1818 and Dahl was paid for the work in February 1819. After Christian Frederik's death in 1848 it was inherited by his son Frederik, who immediately gave it to Countess Danner. After Frederik's death in 1863 it was sold at auction to a private collector in 1864.
