= The Bathers (Cézanne) =

Painting by Paul Cézanne

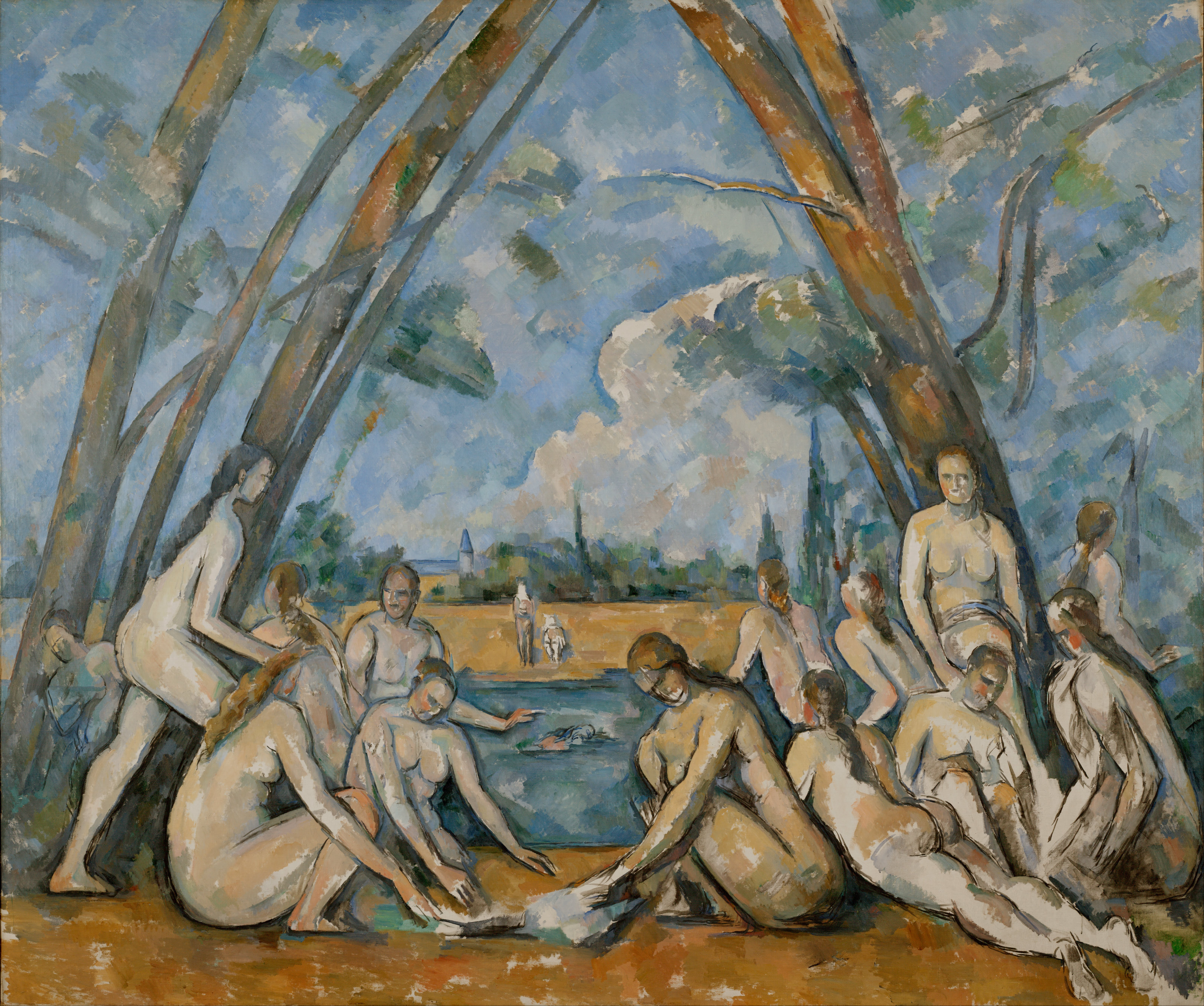
- Artist: Paul Cézanne
- Year: 1898–1905
- Medium: Oil on canvas
- Dimensions: 210.5 cm × 250.8 cm (82.9 in × 98.7 in)
- Location: Philadelphia Museum of Art, Philadelphia
- Accession: W1937-1-1
- Website: philamuseum.org/collection/object/104464

The Bathers (French: Les Grandes Baigneuses) is an oil painting by French artist Paul Cézanne, first exhibited in 1906. The painting, which is held in the Philadelphia Museum of Art, is the largest of a series of Bather paintings by Cézanne; the others are in the Museum of Modern Art in New York City, National Gallery, London, the Barnes Foundation, Pennsylvania, and the Art Institute of Chicago. Occasionally referred to as the Big Bathers or Large Bathers to distinguish it from the smaller works, the painting is considered one of the masterpieces of modern art, and is often considered Cézanne's finest work. The painting was featured in the 1980 BBC Two series 100 Great Paintings.

Cézanne worked on the painting for seven years, and it remained unfinished at the time of his death in 1906.

The painting was purchased in 1937 for US$110,000 (equivalent to $2,463,542 in 2025) with funds from a trust fund for the Philadelphia Museum of Art by their major benefactor, Joseph E. Widener. It was previously owned by Leo Stein.

With each version of the Bathers, Cézanne moved away from the traditional presentation of paintings, intentionally creating works that would not appeal to the novice viewer. He did this to avoid fleeting fads and give a timeless quality to his work, and in so doing paved the way for future artists to disregard current trends and paint pieces that would appeal equally to all generations. The abstract nude females present in Large Bathers give the painting tension and density. It is exceptional among his work in symmetrical dimensions, with the adaptation of the nude forms to the triangular pattern of the trees and river. Using the same technique as employed in painting landscapes and still lifes, Large Bathers is reminiscent of the work of Titian and Peter Paul Rubens. Comparisons are also often made with the other famous group of nude women of the same period, Picasso's Les Demoiselles d'Avignon.

While Cézanne's drawing ability has always been criticized, a critic once said that he "made the ineptly drawn Bathers a warm evocation of leisurely summer bliss."

== Other versions ==
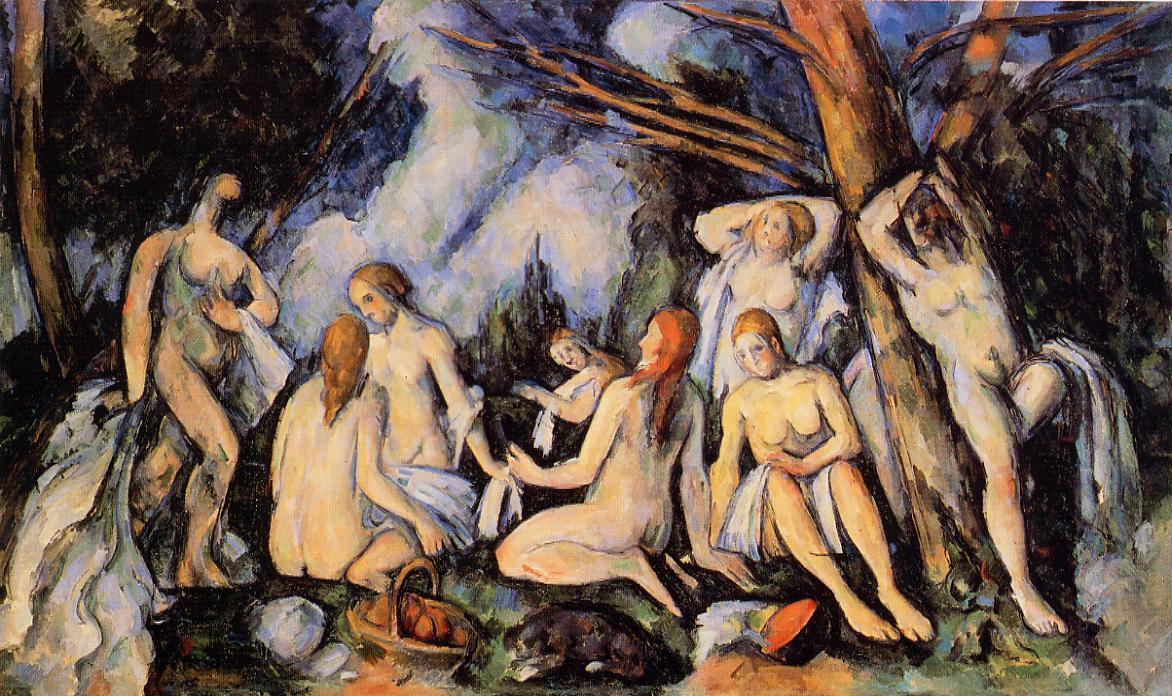
The Large Bathers, 1895–1906. Barnes Foundation, Merion, Pennsylvania

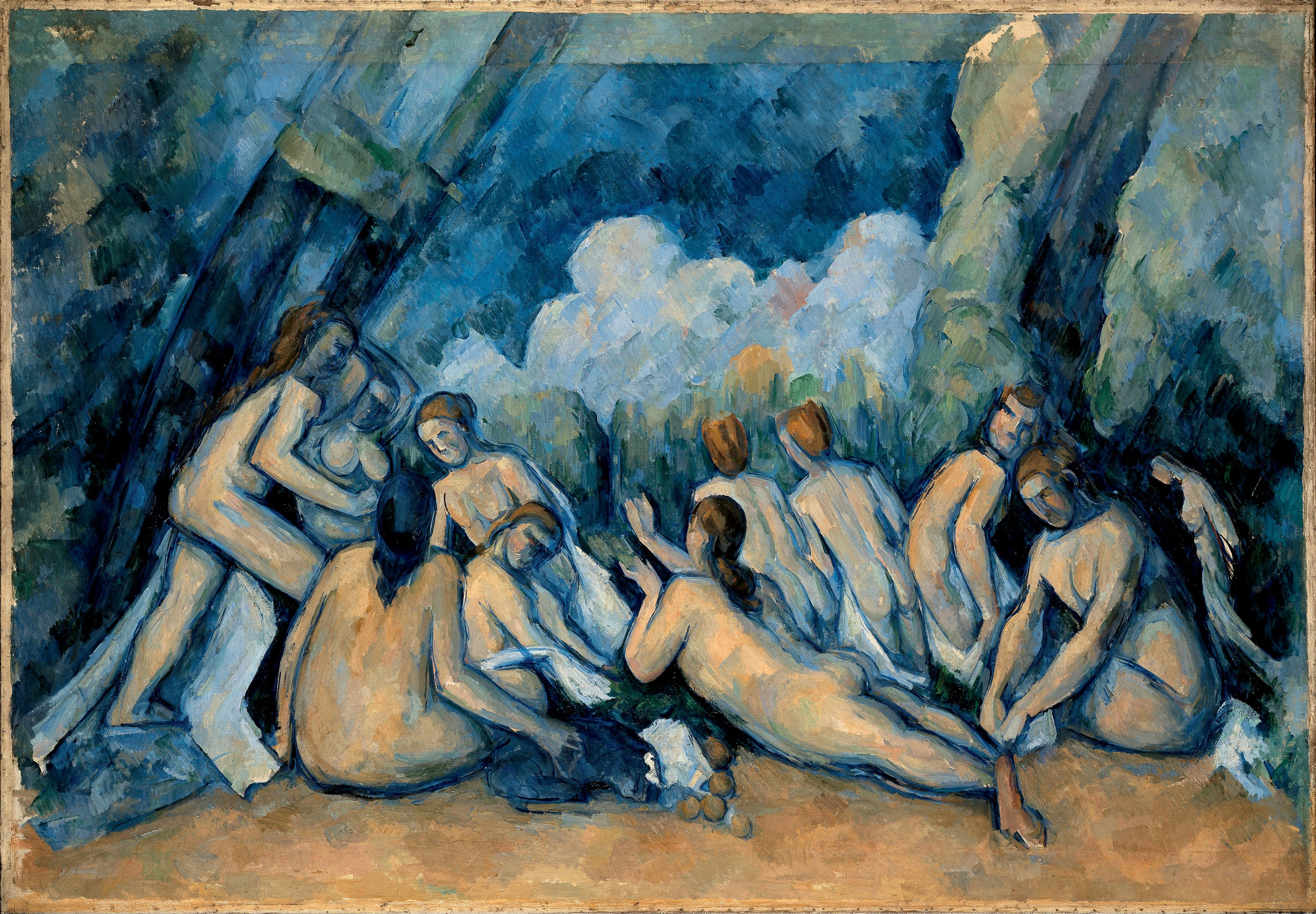
Bathers (Les Grandes Baigneuses), 1894–1905. National Gallery, London

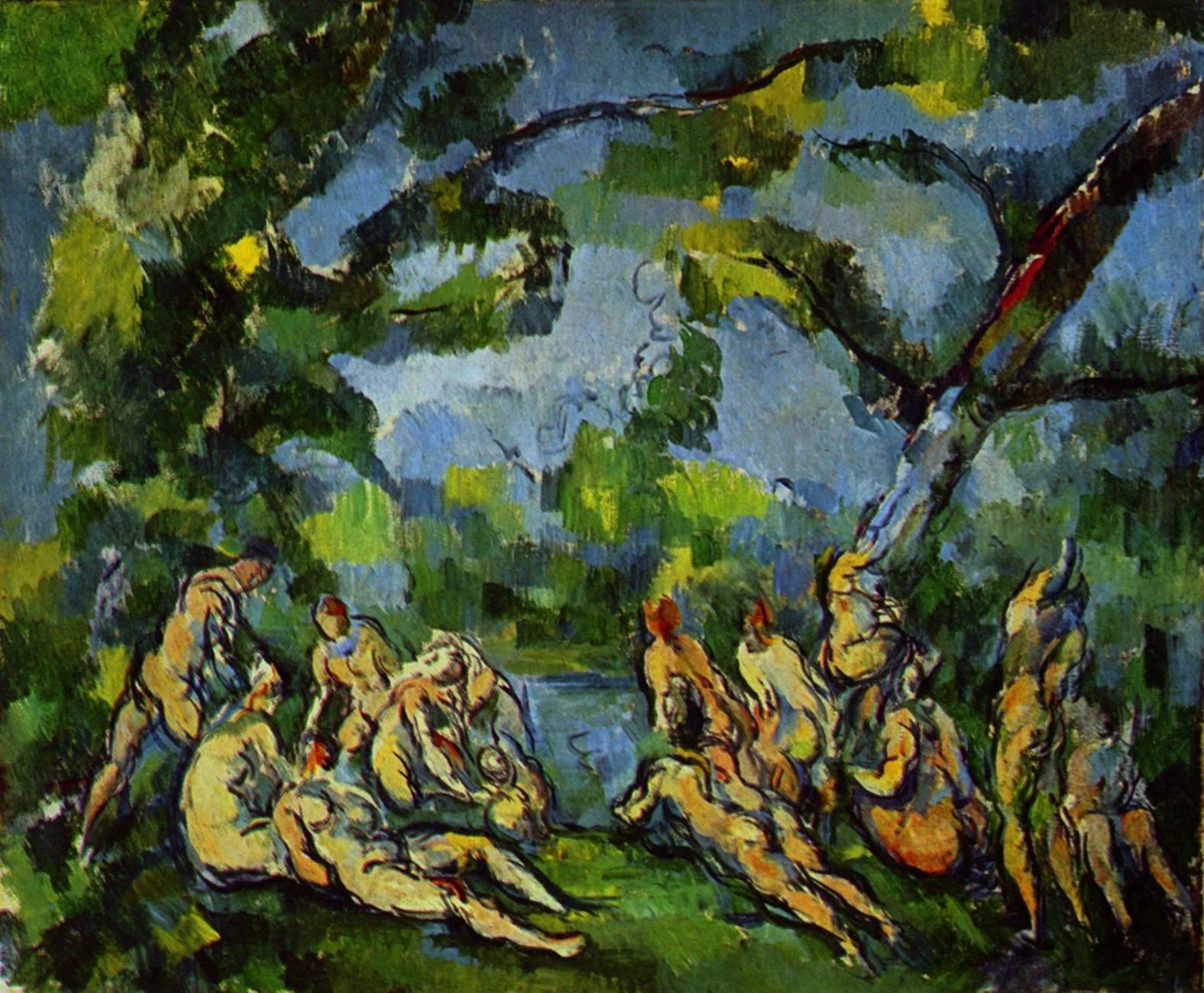
Bathers, 1900–1905, Art Institute of Chicago

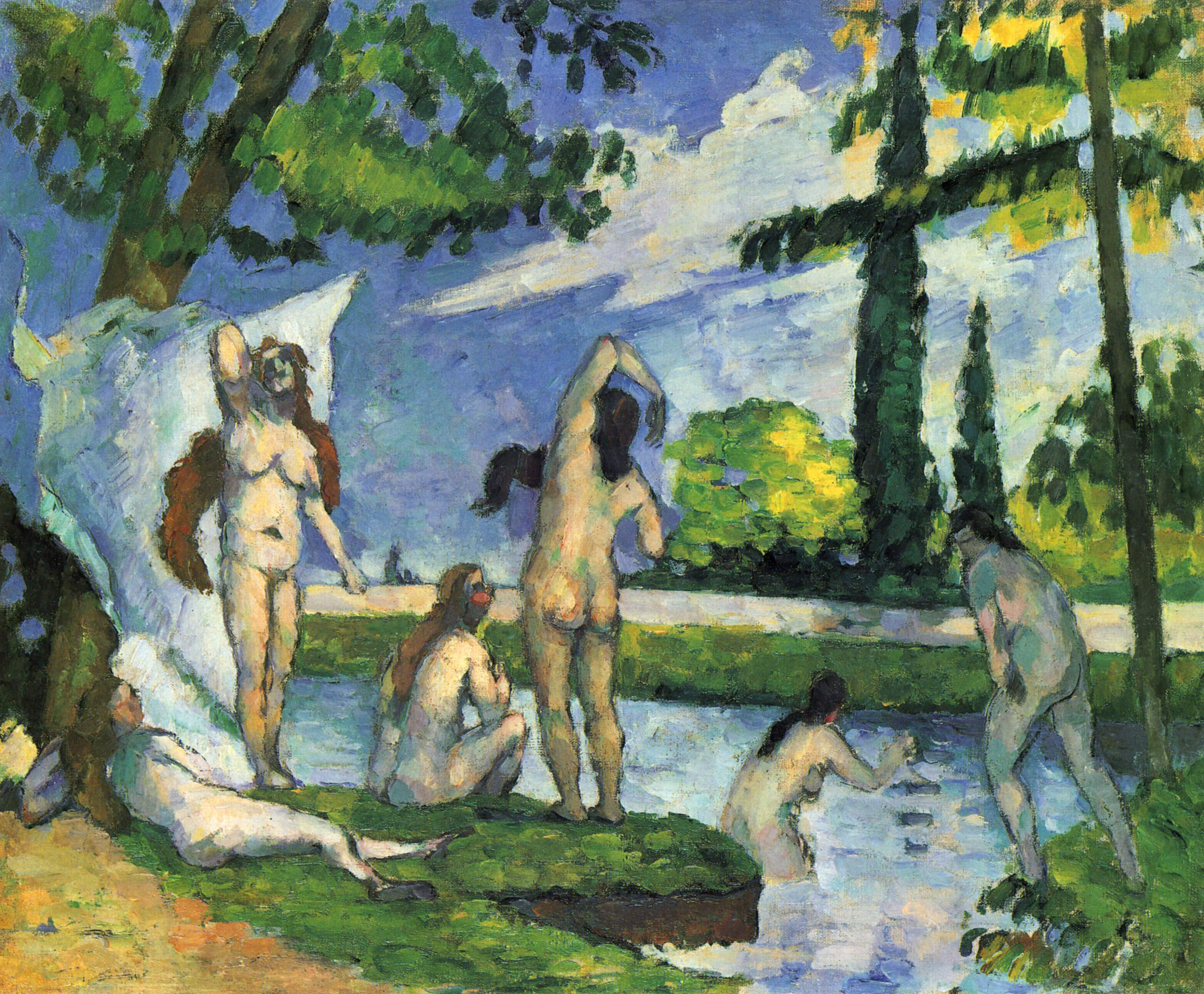
Bathers, 1874–1875, Metropolitan Museum of Art, New York City

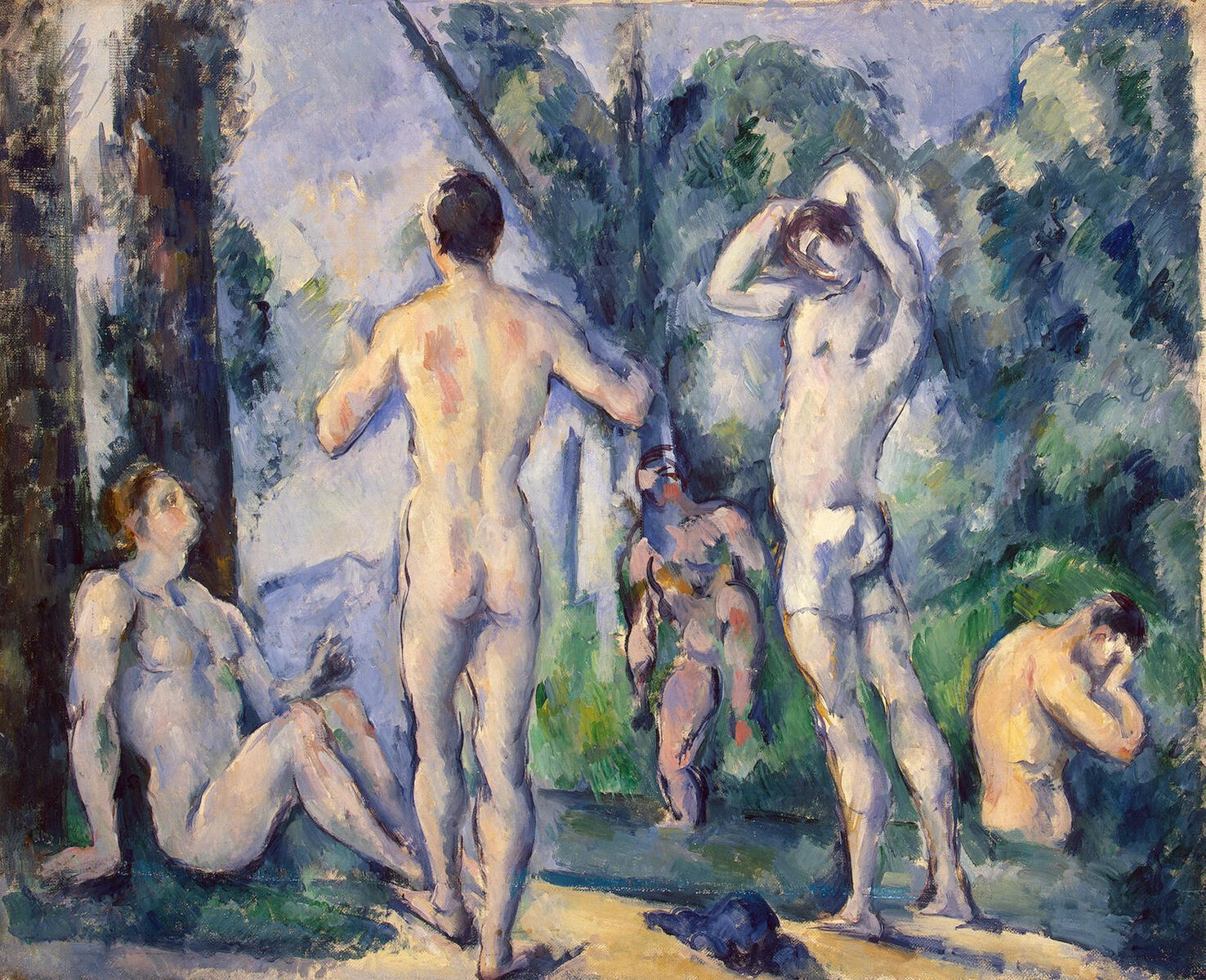
Bathers, 1890 or 1891, Hermitage Museum, Saint Petersburg

== See also ==
- List of paintings by Paul Cézanne
