= Pierre Reverdy =

French poet (1889–1960)

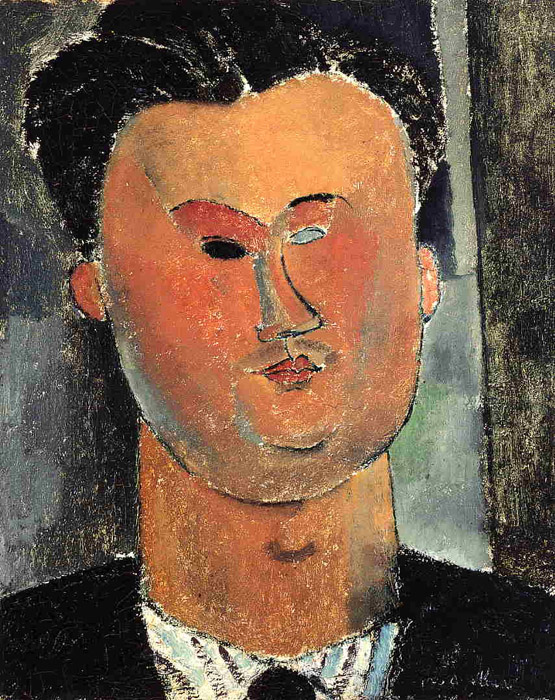
- Pierre Reverdy (by Amedeo Modigliani, 1915)
- Born: 13 September 1889; Narbonne, France
- Died: 17 June 1960 (aged 71); Solesmes, France
- Occupations: Poet, critic
- Writing career
- Period: 1910–1960
- Movement: Surrealism

Pierre Reverdy (French: [ʁəvɛʁdi]; 13 September 1889 – 17 June 1960) was a French poet whose works were inspired by and subsequently proceeded to influence the provocative art movements of the day, Surrealism, Dadaism and Cubism. The loneliness and spiritual apprehension that ran through his poetry appealed to the Surrealist credo. He, though, remained independent of the prevailing "-isms", searching for something beyond their definitions. His writing matured into a mystical mission seeking, as he wrote: "the sublime simplicity of reality."

== Early life ==
The son of a winegrower, Reverdy was born in Occitanie (southern France), in the region of Narbonne, and grew up near the Montagne Noire. The Reverdy ancestors were stonemasons and sculptors associated with work commissioned for churches. The extant facts of his childhood and early years are few and obscured. Some source material indicates that at the time of Reverdy’s birth, his mother was a married woman whose husband was at the time living in Argentina. Further, it is believed that Reverdy’s father and mother were not able to marry each other until 1897. His father schooled him at home, teaching him to read and write.

== Paris ==
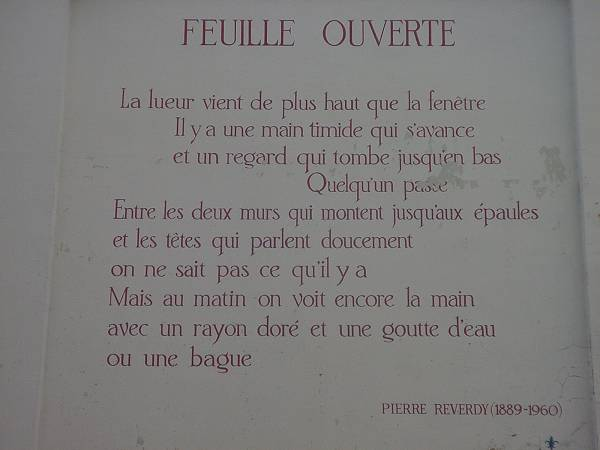
Feuille ouverte (wall poem in Leiden)

Reverdy arrived in Paris in October 1910, devoting his early years there to his writing. It was in Paris, at the artistic enclave centered around the Bateau-Lavoir in Montmartre that he met Guillaume Apollinaire, Max Jacob, Louis Aragon, André Breton, Philippe Soupault and Tristan Tzara. All would come to admire and champion Reverdy’s poetry. Reverdy published a small volume of poetry in 1915. A second compilation of his work brought out in 1924, Les épaves du ciel, brought him greater recognition. The poems were short, fragmentary, the words an evocation of sharp visuals: the volume was the literary equivalent of the Plastic arts as practiced by Cubist painters and sculptors. In the first Surrealist Manifesto, André Breton hailed Reverdy as "the greatest poet of the time." Louis Aragon said that for Breton, Soupault, Éluard and himself, Reverdy was "our immediate elder, the exemplary poet." In 1917, together with Max Jacob, Vicente Huidobro and Guillaume Apollinaire, Reverdy founded the influential journal Nord-Sud ("North-South") which contained many Dadaist and Surrealist contributions. Sixteen issues of Nord-Sud were published, from 15 March 1917 to 15 October 1918. It is believed Reverdy took his inspiration for the title of his periodical from the subway line, the Paris Métro, which in 1910 instituted a route running from Montmartre to Montparnasse; it was Reverdy's intention to unite the vitality of these two distinctive city districts.

By nature, Reverdy was a somber man, whose strong spiritual inclinations led him over time to distance himself from the frenetic world of bohemian Paris. In 1926, in a ritualistic act signifying the renunciation of the material world, he burned many of his manuscripts in front of an assembly of friends. He converted to Catholicism and retreated with his wife, Henriette, to a small house located in proximity to a Benedictine abbey at Solesmes. Excluding intermittent periods when he visited Paris, Solesmes was his home for the next thirty years where he lived a "quasi-monastic life."

== Retreat into seclusion ==
During this time in Solesmes, Reverdy wrote several collections including Sources du vent, Ferraille and Le Chant des morts. Besides this, Reverdy published two volumes containing critical matter (reflections on literature mingled with aphorisms) entitled En vrac and Le livre de mon bord. During the WWII German occupation of France, Reverdy became a partisan in the resistance movement. At the liberation of Paris from Nazi rule, his group of French Resistance fighters were responsible for the capture and arrest of French traitor and German espionage agent Baron Louis de Vaufreland.

== Personal life ==
One of Reverdy’s most enduring and profound relationships was with the couturier Coco Chanel. The intense period of their romantic liaison lasted from 1921-1926. Yet after the fire of this initial involvement cooled, they still maintained a deep bond and great friendship, which would continue for some forty years. He had always been both appalled and intrigued by the wealth and excess that comprised Chanel’s social circle. Reverdy had become enamored with American jazz, which had just become a popular craze in Paris, a type of nightlife for which Chanel expressed contempt. Chanel, however, was a necessary catalyst for his poetic output. She bolstered his confidence, supported his creative ability and further helped assuage his financial instability by secretly buying his manuscripts through his publisher.

It is postulated that the legendary maxims attributed to Chanel and published in periodicals were crafted under the mentorship of Reverdy—a collaborative effort. "A review of her correspondence reveals a complete contradiction between the clumsiness of Chanel the letter writer and the talent of Chanel as a composer of maxims…After correcting the handful of aphorisms that Chanel wrote about her métier, Reverdy added to this collection of 'Chanelisms' a series of thoughts of a more general nature, some touching on life and taste, others on allure and love."

Purportedly, Reverdy was not fully aware of the extent of Chanel’s wartime collaboration with the Nazis. However, as he subscribed to a belief that women were the weaker, more vulnerable sex, he rationalized that Chanel had been manipulated by men who convinced her to champion German interests. Further, as a staunch Catholic, Reverdy was able to absolve Chanel of her transgressions. Indeed, so strong was his tie to her that in 1960, sensing his death was imminent, he wrote a poem to the woman whom he had loved for the past forty years.

Dear Coco, here it is
The best of my hand
And the best of me
I offer it thus to you
With my heart
With my hand
Before heading toward
The dark road’s end
If condemned
If pardoned
Know you are loved

== Death ==
Reverdy died in 1960 at Solesmes.

== Praise ==
A glass of papaya juice
and back to work. My heart is in my
pocket, it is Poems by Pierre Reverdy.
—Frank O'Hara, "A Step Away From Them"

"Reverdy's strange landscapes, which combine an intense inwardness with a proliferation of sensual data, bear in them the signs of a continual search for an impossible totality. Almost mystical in their effect, his poems are nevertheless anchored in the minutiae of the everyday world; in their quiet, at times monotone music, the poet seems to evaporate, to vanish into the haunted country he has created. The result is at once beautiful and disquieting as if Reverdy had emptied the space of the poem in order to let the reader inhabit it" —Paul Auster

== Works ==
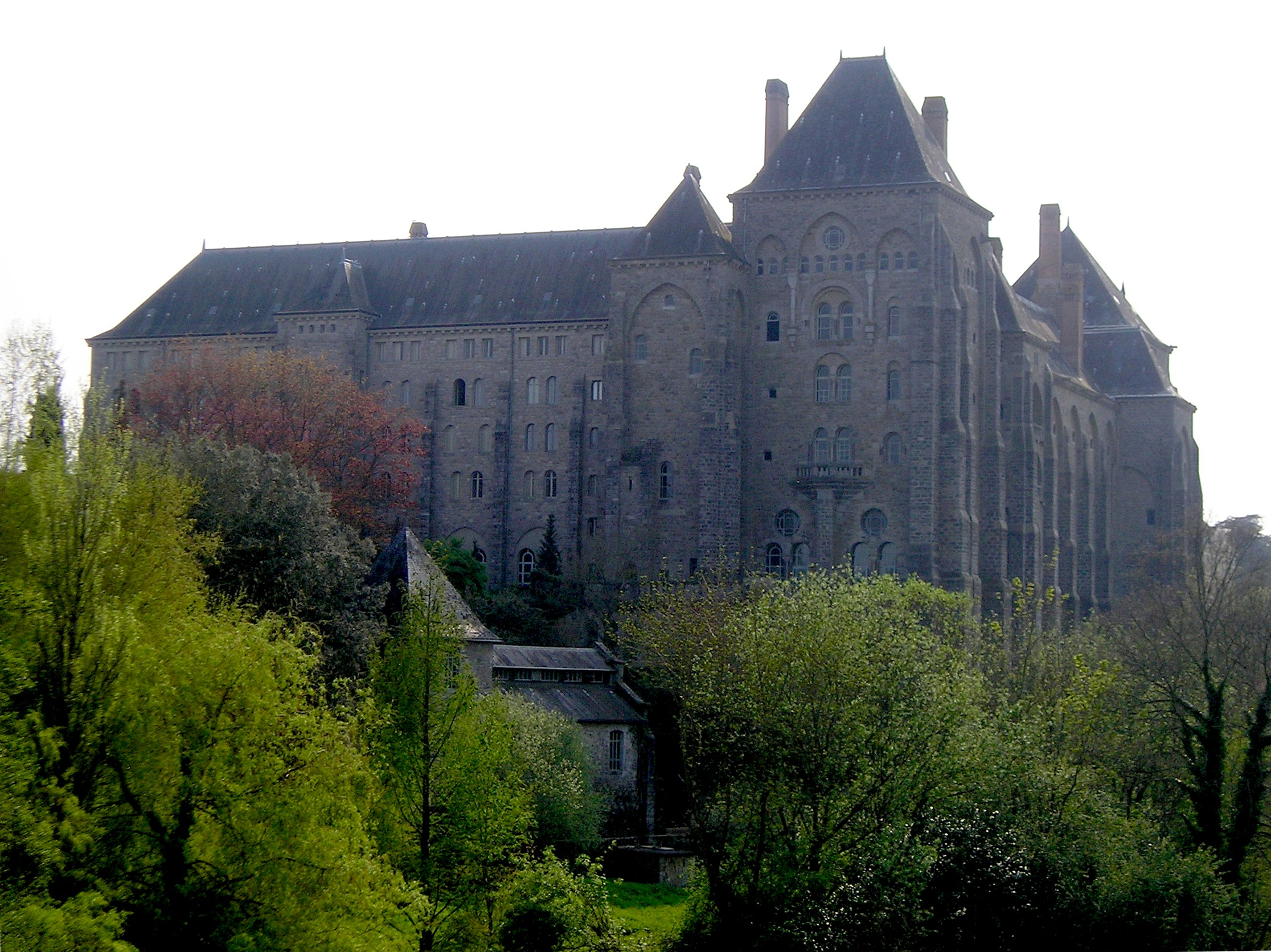
St. Peter's Abbey, Solesmes

- 1915 Poèmes en prose (Paris, Imprimerie Birault).
- 1916 La Lucarne ovale (Birault).
- 1916 Quelques poèmes (Birault).
- 1917 Le Voleur de Talan, roman (Avignon, Imprimerie Rullière).
- 1918 Les Ardoises du toit, illustrated by Georges Braque (Birault).
- 1918 Les Jockeys camouflés et période hors-texte, (Imprimerie F. Bernouard).
- 1919 La Guitare endormie, (Imprimerie Birault).
- 1919 Self defence. Critique-Esthétique. (Birault).
- 1921 Étoiles peintes, (Paris, Sagittaire).
- 1921 Cœur de chêne, (Éditions de la Galerie Simon).
- 1922 Cravates de chanvre, (Éditions Nord-Sud).
- 1924 Pablo Picasso et son œuvre, in Pablo Picasso(Gallimard).
- 1924 Les Épaves du ciel (Gallimard).
- 1925 Écumes de la mer, (Gallimard).
- 1925 Grande nature (Paris, Les Cahiers libres).
- 1926 La Peau de l'homme, (Gallimard).
- 1927 Le Gant de crin (Plon).
- 1928 La Balle au bond, (Marseille, Les Cahiers du Sud).
- 1929 Sources du vent, (Maurice Sachs éditeur).
- 1929 Flaques de verre (Gallimard).
- 1930 Pierres blanches, (Carcassonne, Éditions d'art Jordy).
- 1930 Risques et périls, contes 1915-1928 (Gallimard).
- 1937 Ferraille (Brussels).
- 1937 Preface for Déluges by Georges Herment (José Corti).
- 1940 Plein verre (Nice).
- 1945 Plupart du temps, poèmes 1915-1922, which collects Poèmes en prose, Quelques poèmes, La Lucarne ovale, Les Ardoises du toit, Les Jockeys camouflés, La Guitare endormie, Étoiles peintes, Cœur de chêne et Cravates de chanvre (Gallimard, reedited in 1969 in the « Poésie » series).
- 1945 Preface for Souspente by Antoine Tudal (Paris, Éditions R.J. Godet).
- 1946 Visages, (Paris, Éditions du Chêne).
- 1948 Le Chant des morts, (Tériade éditeur).
- 1948 Le Livre de mon bord, notes 1930-1936 (Mercure de France).
- 1949 Tombeau vivant, Dulce et decorum est pro patria mori, in Tombeau de Jean-Sébastien Galanis (Paris, imprimé par Daragnès).
- 1949 Main d'œuvre, poèmes 1913-1949, which collects: Grande nature, La Balle au bond, Sources du vent, Pierres blanches, Ferraille, Plein verre and Le Chant des morts and adds Cale sèche and Bois vert, (Mercure de France).
- 1950 Une aventure méthodique, (Paris, Mourlot).
- 1953 Cercle doré, (Mourlot).
- 1955 Au soleil du plafond, (Tériade éditeur).
- 1956 En vrac (Monaco, Éditions du Rocher).
- 1959 La Liberté des mers, (Éditions Maeght).
- 1962 À René Char, (Alès, P. A. Benoît, poème épistolaire tiré à 4 ex.)
- 1966 Sable mouvant, (Paris, L. Broder éditeur).

== Translations in English ==
English translations of Reverdy's work have appeared in a smattering of volumes over the years, most of which are now out of print but still available used. Beginning in the early sixties, several writers have produced translations of Reverdy's work, notably Kenneth Rexroth, John Ashbery, Mary Ann Caws, Patricia Ann Terry and, more recently, Ron Padgett.

- Pierre Reverdy: Selected Poems - translated by Kenneth Rexroth (New Directions, 1969)
- Roof Slates and Other Poems of Pierre Reverdy - translated by Caws & Terry (Northeastern Univ. Press, 1981)
- Selected Poems by Pierre Reverdy - edited by Timothy Bent and Germaine Brée (Wake Forest Univ. Press / Bloodaxe (UK), 1991)
- Prose Poems - translated by Ron Padgett (Black Square Editions, 2007)
- Haunted House (long prose poem) - translated by John Ashbery (Black Square Editions, 2007)
- Pierre Reverdy - edited by Mary Ann Caws (New York Review of Books, 2013)
- Poems Early to Late Pierre Reverdy - translated by Mary Ann Caws and Patricia Terry (Black Widow Press, Boston, 2014)
- The Song of the Dead - translated by Dan Bellm (Black Square Editions, 2016)
- The Thief of Talant - translated by Ian Seed (Wakefield Press, 2016)

== See also ==
- Still Life with a Poem, 1915 painting by Juan Gris which includes a poem by Reverdy.
