= Pop-up retail =

Retail tactic of opening shops for short periods

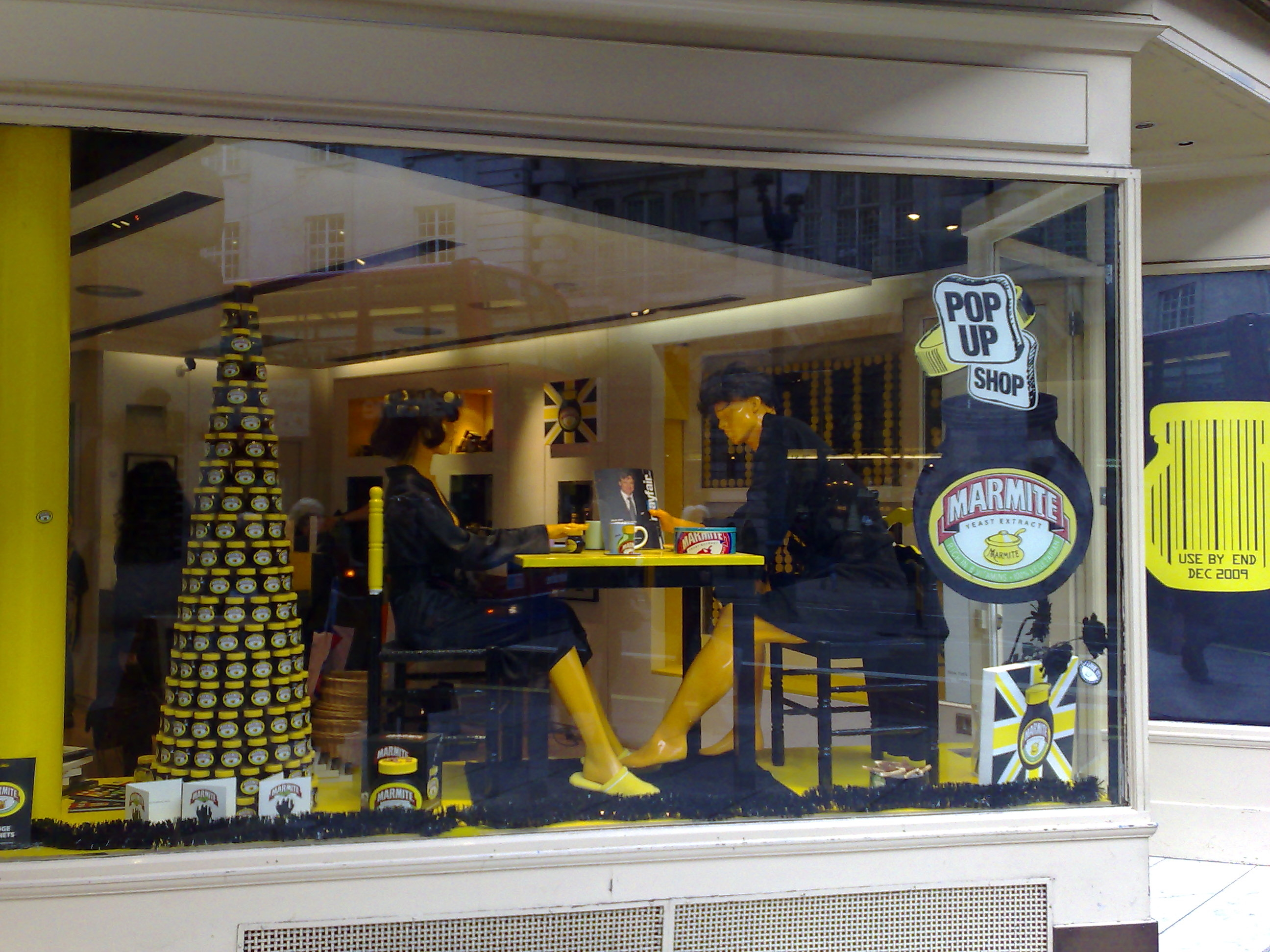
Marmite pop-up shop in London

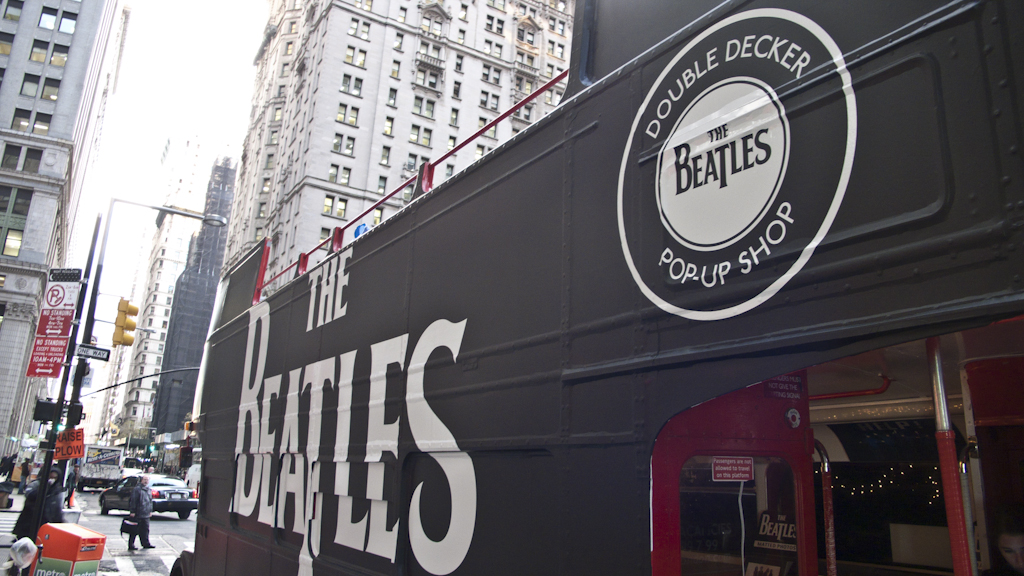
The Beatles double-decker pop-up shop in New York City

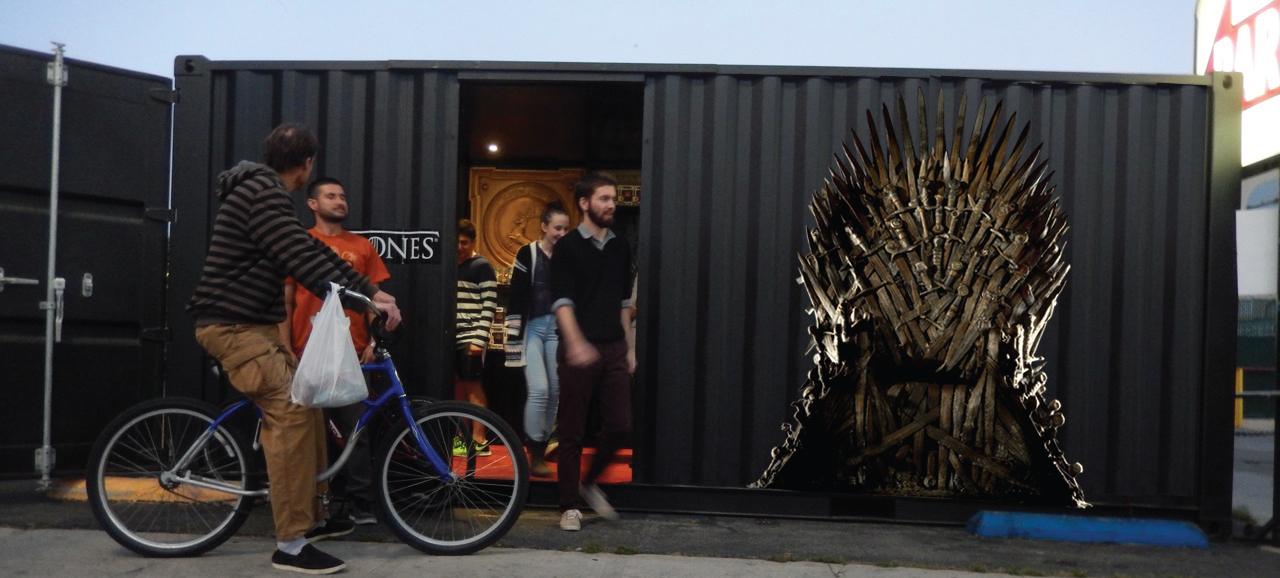
HBO Game of Thrones container pop-up in Los Angeles

Pop-up retail, also known as pop-up store (pop-up shop in the UK, Australia and Ireland) or flash retailing, is a trend of opening short-term sales spaces that last for days to weeks before closing down, often to latch onto a fad or scheduled event.

The modern trend of pop-up retail started in Los Angeles in the late 1990s, and went on to become used internationally, being particularly popular in the United States, Canada, United Kingdom and Australia. Pop-up retail was an increasing factor during the retail apocalypse of the 2010s, including seasonal Halloween retailers who operate stores in vacant spaces during the season. In 2018 the pop-up industry was estimated to be worth $50 billion.

== History ==
The term pop-up retail can be traced to the late 1990s, although temporary retail options, such as street markets and fairs, have existed for centuries.

European Christmas markets, seasonal farmers' markets, holiday fireworks stands, Halloween costume shops, consumer expos, and event-specific concessions are other examples of temporary retailing.

The Ritual Expo was one of the first iterations of the modern pop-up retail store. Not yet referred to as pop-up retail, the 1997 Los Angeles event was created by Patrick Courrielche and was later branded as a one-day "ultimate hipster mall.” The event quickly caught the eye of large brands that saw the potential of creating short-term experiences to promote their products to target audiences. AT&T, Levi-Strauss, and Motorola worked with Courrielche to create pop-up shopping experiences across the country to market their products to young audiences.

In November 2002, discount retailer Target took over a 220-foot-long boat at Chelsea Piers for a two-week stay on the Hudson River that coincided with Black Friday. Vacant, a Los Angeles, California based business specializing in pop-ups, arrived in New York in February 2003, working with Dr. Martens on a pop-up space at 43 Mercer Street.

Song Airlines opened a pop-up shop in New York City in 2003. Comme des Garçons opened, for one year, a pop-up shop in 2004 with the 'Guerrilla Shop' tag. Trendwatching.com claims to have coined the term "Pop-Up Retail" in January 2004. In November 2013, Samsung opened a pop-up shop in New York City's Soho area that worked as a brand experience space. The temporary pop-up space was extended and eventually became a permanent retail space. In July 2015 Fourth Element opened the world's first underwater pop-up shop at a depth of 6 metres / 19 feet at TEKCamp.2015 in Somerset, England.

Other brands that have developed pop-up shops as part of their campaigns include Kate Spade, Gucci, Louis Vuitton and Colette.

Pop-up Retail began extending into other genres around 2009, when the Pop-up restaurant - temporary restaurants popping up in various locations - began growing in public interest and frequency. Just as car manufacturers are using the concept for the presentation and sale of new models. Suppliers of classic cars also offer vehicles in Classic Cars Pop-Up Stores.

One of the most widespread pop up stores in the United States and Canada is Spirit Halloween, which opens 1,400 pop up stores around the country every year, selling Halloween costumes, decorations, and more.

The trend is also widespread in the UK, where landlords have used the trend to fill vacant space.

Newbury Street in Boston has recently become a hotbed for pop-up retail, hosting temporary storefronts for Martellus Bennett, Cotton, Kanye West and other local brands.

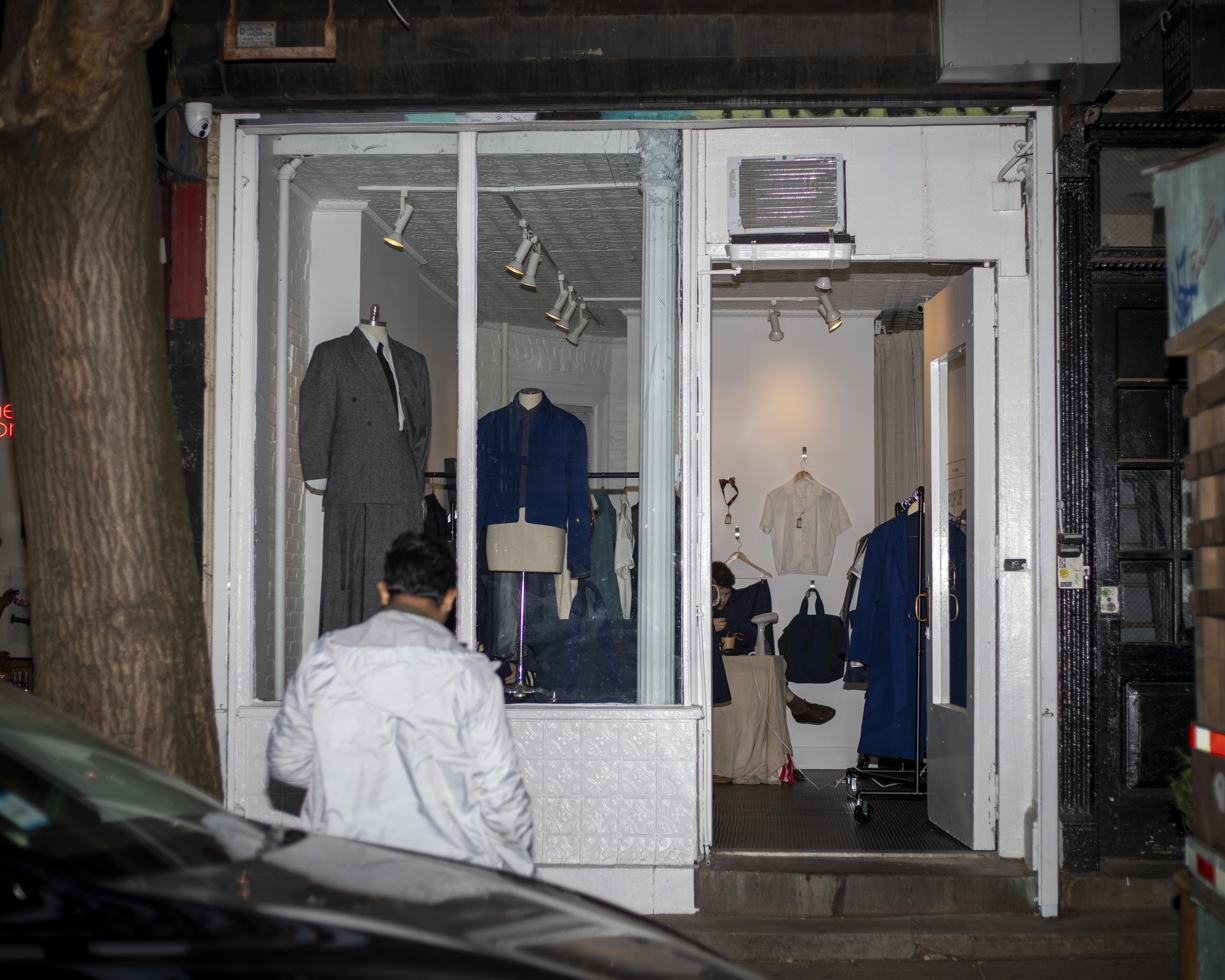
A fashion label hosts a pop-up shop in New York City

== Concept ==
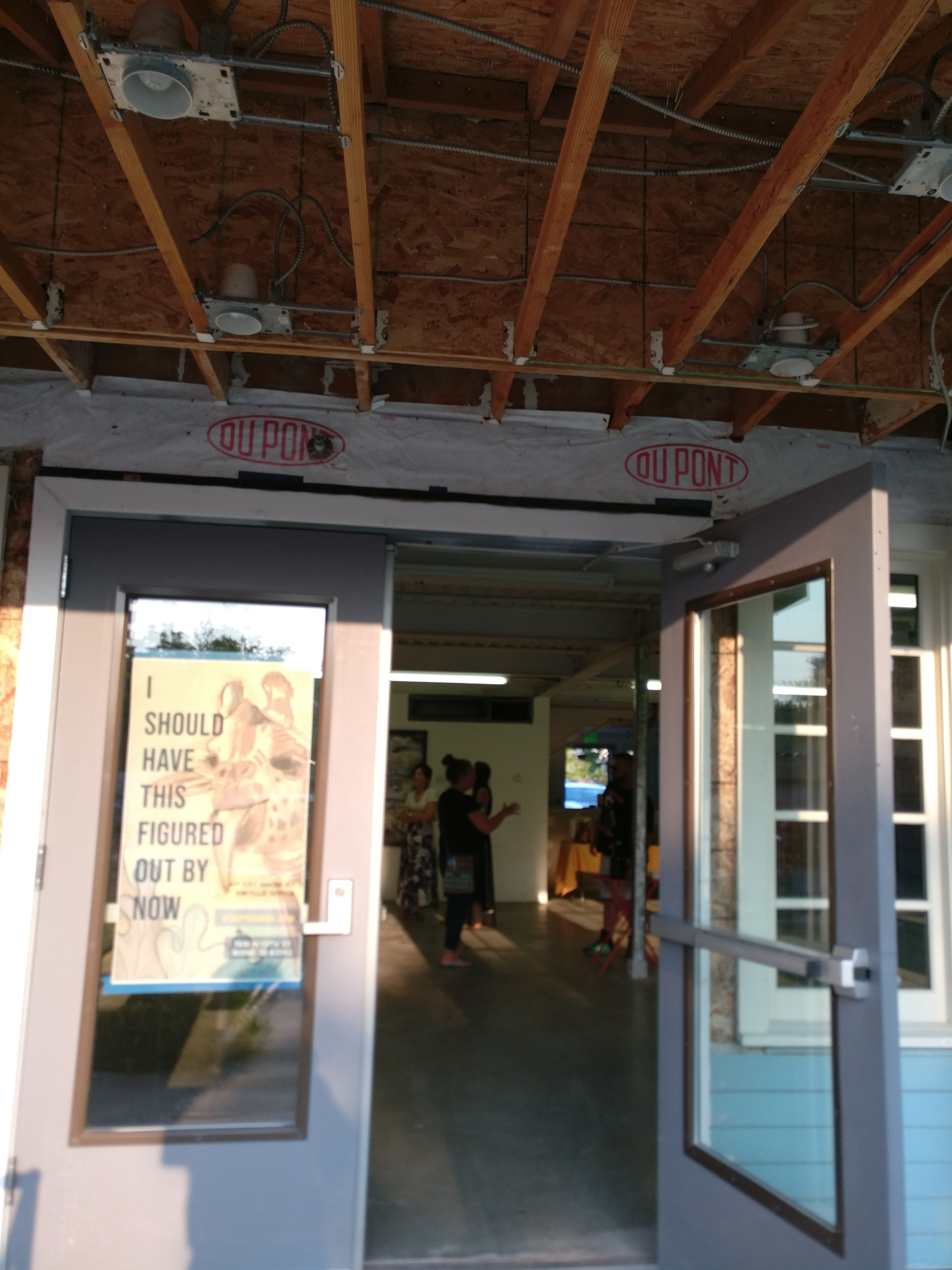
The pop-up model is also used by artists. Here a building under renovation serves as a one-evening art exhibit in Boise, Idaho.

A pop-up retail space is a venue that is temporary: the space could be a sample sale one day and host a private cocktail party the next evening. The trend involves "popping up" one day, then disappearing anywhere from one day to several weeks later. These shops, while small and temporary, are used by companies to build interest in their product or service, and seed their product with cultural influencers. Pop-up retail allows a company to create a unique environment that engages their customers and generates a feeling of relevance and interactivity. They are often used by marketers for seasonal items such as Halloween costumes and decorations, Christmas gifts and Christmas trees, or fireworks. The pop-up retail model has also been used on the concert scene, as at the Treefort Music Fest, to provide all-ages or family friendly venues, often at restaurants or vacated retail establishments which do not routinely host musical acts; these ephemeral establishments are known as pop-up venues.

There are various benefits to pop-ups such as marketing, testing products, locations, or markets, and as a low-cost way to start a business. Some pop-up shops, such as Ricky's and other Halloween stores (like Spirit Halloween), are seasonal, allowing brands to capture foot traffic without committing to a long-term lease. Other brands use pop-ups to create engagement, such as Marc Jacobs Tweet Shop's exchange of "social currency" for free product, and King and McGaw who used a pop-up to exhibit and sell prints from the Mourlot Studios in Soho, London.

This concept has also spread into other countries such as Australia. For example, H&M Australia made pop-up stores in 2015 and Uniqlo did it in 2014 to test the market. In Japan, the library Morioka Shoten, a bookshop located in the Ginza district of Tokyo, is best known for its concept of offering copies of a single book for sale each week.

== See also ==
- Pop-up exhibition
- Pop-up hotel
