= Edmond Astruc =

French painter

Edmond Astruc (November 4, 1878 – January 11, 1977) was a French painter. As a native of Marseille in Southern France, his paintings typically depicted scenes in and around Marseille.

== Biography ==
Astruc studied at the School of Fine Arts in Marseille. When he was ten years old, he worked with his father in the family tannery and leather goods workshop.

In addition to his creative work, Astruc also had hobbies such as sailing, skiing, and motorcycling. In 1913, he had a serious accident on a Hanriot airplane at the aerodrome of Reims. In June 1914, he traversed the Rhône by hydrofoil, on behalf of Henri Fabre, to Aix-les-Bains, a town known for its Roman-era thermal springs.

He was a test pilot in Toulon and then in Saint-Raphaël, Var during World War I. After the war, he returned to painting. He commented: ″This time of my life, spent in aviation, the continuous contact with great spaces of the sky and the sea, rejuvenated and purified my vision. I returned to clarity, to light and to the atmosphere of my first years of painting".

Astruc participated in numerous annual exhibitions in Marseille, Paris, Algiers, Lyon, Grenoble, Geneva, and Aix-en-Provence, from 1930 to 1939. In 1936, he was elected to the Academy of Marseille's Arts class. In 1956, Astruc presented his works at the Galerie Mourlot under the exhibit title "50 years of painting by the Marseilles painter Edmond Astruc". The exhibit was a visual journey through the evolution of his art.

In World War II, he volunteered his services in aviation as a technical agent for SNCASE in Marignane. He was assigned to Evreux, where he worked in aircraft construction until the German invasion of Northern France. He then continued his trade in Angoulême. During the invasion of the free zone, he hid some of his equipment so it would not fall into the hands of the enemy, and rejoined his family in Marseille. The occupiers destroyed his house in the Saint-Lazare district in 1943 to install a defense battery for the Old Port, forcing his family to find refuge until the end of the war.

After the war, he bought an old country house at Roucas-Blanc in Marseille, where he set up his workshop and continued to exhibit.

In 1959, he built a catamaran on the model of two floatplane floats, and left Marseille along the coast.

Astruc's last work, La Favière, remains unfinished as he died on January 11, 1977.
