= Still Life with a Poem =

1915 painting by Juan Gris

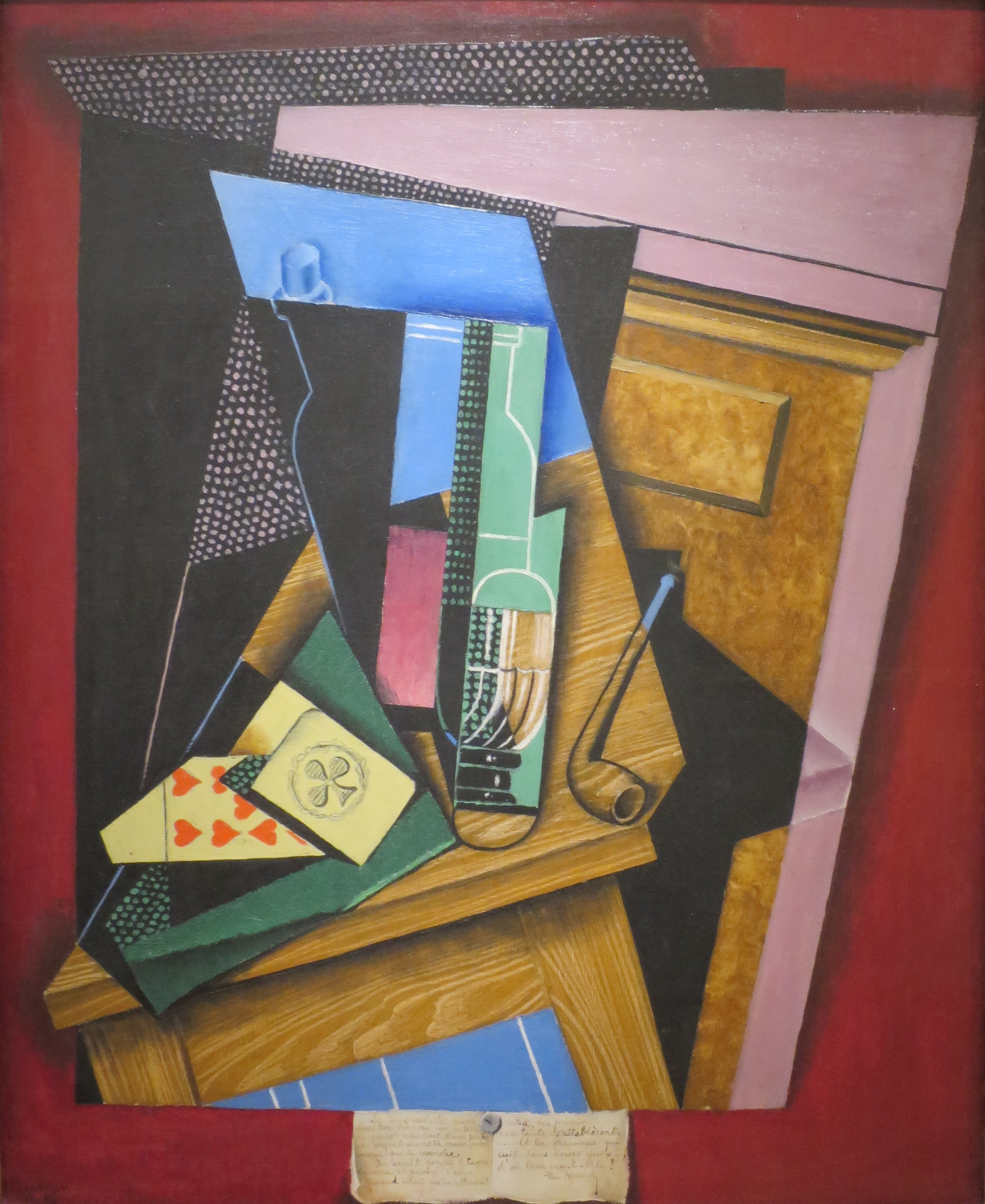
- Artist: Juan Gris
- Completion date: 1915 (110 years ago)
- Type: Oil painting
- Dimensions: 80.6 cm × 64.8 cm (31.7 in × 25.5 in)
- Location: Norton Simon Museum, Pasadena, California

Still Life with a Poem is an oil painting by Spanish artist Juan Gris, completed in 1915. It is held at the Norton Simon Museum, in Pasadena.

Still life paintings depict real objects but not always from a specific viewpoint, as multiple viewpoints of a subject can be depicted. The idea of space is rearranged in Still Life with a Poem, which is painted entirely of oils and imitates a collage on a wood grain table. A poem by Pierre Reverdy is contained at the bottom of the oil painting, which seems to be creating a comparison between two separate paintings. This was Gris's first truly collaborative piece. Previously, he had worked with Reverdy to create a collaborative work but was abandoned because of the difficulty of printing during the war.

Juan Gris was born in Madrid in 1887. He lived for 39 years and died in 1927. Gris, whose real name was Jose Victoriano Gonzalez-Perez, studied engineering before becoming an artist. He created many famous works, including many pieces with Pierre Reverdy. The abstract art form, known as Cubism, was the most revolutionary art form in the 20th century. Originally developed by well-known figures like Picasso and Braque around 1907. Gris was a friend and neighbor of Picasso when living in Paris. Gris was known for refining this abstract art form into his own recognizable visual art form. As a recognizable figure in art, oftentimes he was referred to as 'the third cubist'.

Pierre Reverdy, one of the greatest modern French poets, was born in 1889 and died in 1960. Like Gris, his work is well known and instantly recognizable. Reverdy was often described as a secret poet for secret readers. When Octavio Paz first described him like this, he talked about how often Reverdy would break the silence and disrupt empty spaces. Reverdy had always wished to not be well known, but his distinctive pieces helped him create the cubist poet population that he gained. His collaborative work with still-life paintings ended in 1927, due to the death of his peer, Gris. Like Gris, Reverdy worked closely with Pablo Picasso and Georges Braque.
