= Le Taureau =

Litographs by Pablo Picasso

Le Taureau

Le Taureau (French: the bull) is a series of lithographs by Pablo Picasso made with the assistance of Fernand Mourlot from December 1945 to January 1946. In his memoir Mourlot recalled that "in order to achieve his pure and linear rendering of the bull, he had to pass through all of the intermediary stages".

The series depicts a bull as it is progressively refined through 11 images to the simplest rendering of form.

Picasso made the initial drawing of the bull on 15 December 1945. The initial drawing of the bull is the rarest lithograph of the series as only 2 or 3 were produced. The third rendering of the bull was described by Fernand Mourlot as a terrible creature, with terrifying horns and eyes. Still unsatisfied, Picasso progressively simplified the drawing until it became increasingly geometric. The simplicity of the final image has been compared to a hieroglyph. Despite the simplicity of the final image the Portland Art Museum describes it as "nonetheless eloquently captur[ing] the power and bulk of the bovine".

The eleventh and final image was created on January 17. Mourlot believed this was the bull in its "essential form", having been "rendered in a few perfectly placed lines...with his pinhead and ridiculous horns like antennae". Mourlot recalled that his workers "regretted seeing such a magnificent bull transformed bit by bit into a sort of insect". Mourlot's assistant Jean Célestin said that with the final image "Picasso ended up where normally he should have started". Picasso's technique of progressive refinement inspired Andre Minaux in his lithography.

The series was made in an edition of 50; with an additional 18 artists proofs.

Le Taureau is number 389 in Georges Bloch's Catalogue of the Printed Graphic Work of Picasso.
