= The Thief of Talant =

French poem

- Author: Pierre Reverdy
- Original title: Le Voleur de Talan
- Translator: Ian Seed
- Cover artist: Eugene Atget
- Language: French
- Published: 1917
- Publisher: Flammarion, Wakefield Press
- Publication place: France
- English publication date: 2016
- Pages: 125
- ISBN: 978-1-939663-19-1

The Thief of Talant (French: Le Voleur de Talan) was written by French poet Pierre Reverdy. Originally written in 1917, the work was not translated into English until 2016 by Ian Seed. It is a short collection of "chapters" chronicling Reverdy's, who is the Thief of Talant, disillusionment with France and the isolation he felt as a poet in the one city where he believed poetry could flourish. Additionally, in many parts of the novel there are brief moments characterizing Reverdy's professional relationships with unnamed characters with whom Reverdy was associated during his time in Paris. Ultimately, The Thief of Talant follows Reverdy through a dream-like novel concluding with his spiritual death and rebirth.

== Plot summary ==
The narrative of The Thief of Talant is not so much a narrative, but a poetic autobiography. As such, the novel does not have a series of concrete plot points but rather details a descent into despair and isolation where Reverdy, as the main character (the Thief of Talant) finds that his time in Paris has ultimately killed his past, more lively self.

The Thief of Talant begins with the reflections of a character who will later be known as the Thief of Talant waiting at a train station in his home town of Narbonne for Paris. When he arrives in Paris, the Thief encounters a man who offers to help him and get him an apartment. The narrative jumps forward three months later with the man, known now as Abel the Magus, coming to check in on how the Thief is settling in Paris. The Thief then reflects on the necessity of poets in elucidating the mysteries of life to the man. Then he goes to a café with two unnamed characters, noting that the people in crowded Parisian streets are no more than a collective of unthinking animals. He waits until nightfall and then walks alone on the streets, a common choice the Thief makes throughout the novel. The next day he goes to visit Abel the Magus in his own apartment and he describes how easily a writer's work can be stolen and Abel is quite paranoid of this happening to him. Abel the Magus distrusts the Thief of Talant who then antagonizes Abel by satirizing his fears, calling them unfounded. This point marks the transition between the young man who first came to Paris, and the deterioration of that spiritual being in the next half of the novel.

The Thief takes to the streets again and now more clearly realizes that Paris cares little for ambitious poets as all they do is laugh at him and point out the foreign nature of his accent, ostracizing him. Thus, the Thief thinks back to how he was when he first came to Paris and that his past self is likened to a trace of footsteps that he can no longer be followed back. While not completely broken, at this point in the narrative, the Thief accepts that he is changing and that he is definitively isolated within the loud and crowded confines of a city that he thought would accept him. The narrative then rapidly derails as he finds himself wandering more and more at night, believing that he is caught in a sinister dream and referring now only to his past self as "The Other." This point of the narrative shifts drastically and the Thief describes The Other quite morbidly as lying dead under a tree, trying to come to terms with the new parts of his disconsolate self. Further, Abel the Magus—the Thief's tentative friend and mentor—becomes consumed with paranoia of others stealing his works and all his friends no longer associate with him. At this point, the Thief explicitly acknowledges that the body and spirit of the young man who first came to Paris is no longer present. He then laments on how he came to Paris to express himself but has forgotten what he wanted to say in the first place. Believing that he too has pushed away his friends by becoming so crest-fallen, the Thief submits to his utter solitude and depression. The Thief of Talant somberly concludes with the Thief accepting the death of his naivete and creative innocence.

== Structure ==
Reverdy's novel is written as an experiment in the relationship of the text on a page and the space it fills. For most of the novel Reverdy chooses to write in very erratic patterns. The Thief of Talant is written in a dream-like stream of consciousness which blurs distinctions between characters in the novel. Despite Reverdy's cubist influences, he resented being called a cubist poet and did not want to be labeled. According to Alex Davis, however, author of A History of Modernist Poetry, Reverdy's poetic narrative follows the very subject centered, anecdotal nature of the literary time period (which is an overlap of Cubism, Existentialism, and Surrealism). The "chapters" consist of a series of verses in erratic form followed by a single page of bold text in one stanza in which Reverdy reflects on the thoughts of the previous verses. One of the influences on the imagery and structure of Le Voleur de Talan is an associate Reverdy would often meet in Parisian cafes to discuss poetic form: Guillaume Apollinaire. Both individuals are considered precursors of the surrealist movement, and Reverdy in particular wrote Le Voleur de Talan as a pioneer work in creating "a pure spirit" of creative energy by manipulating poetic form.

== Main characters ==
=== The Thief of Talant ===
The protagonist of this poetic novel, The Thief of Talant, is Reverdy himself attempting to find solidarity in what he perceives to be the accepting Parisian poetic scene before he learns otherwise.

=== Abel the Magus ===
A satirical representation of Max Jacob, a friend and mentor of Reverdy, he houses the Thief of Talant but develops a mistrust for him later in the novel out of fear that he will steal his poetic work.

== Reception ==
The poetic novel was not initially well received when it was published in France in 1917 as readers found the experimental structure and narrative difficult to follow. After the Armistice of 1918 it became moderately more popular, but still not very much so. Reverdy received an offer in 1924 for his work to be republished but he declined stating that he felt his work was "too clumsy". The book was only recently republished in 2016 by Wakefield Press and has since been better received: The Three Percent and Poetry Salzburg Review both praise The Thief of Talant as a strong translation of a complex novel.

== Editions and translations ==
- Reverdy, Pierre. "Le Voleur de Talan." Flammarion. Paris: 1917. Print. ISBN 2080602594
- Reverdy, Pierre. "Le Voleur de Talan." French and European Pubns. 1967. Print. ISBN 0686547330
- Reverdy, Pierre. "The Thief of Talant." Wakefield Press. Cambridge: 2016. Print. ISBN 9781939663191
- The Thief of Talant has only been published in French and, as of 2016, English.
