= Fernand Mourlot =

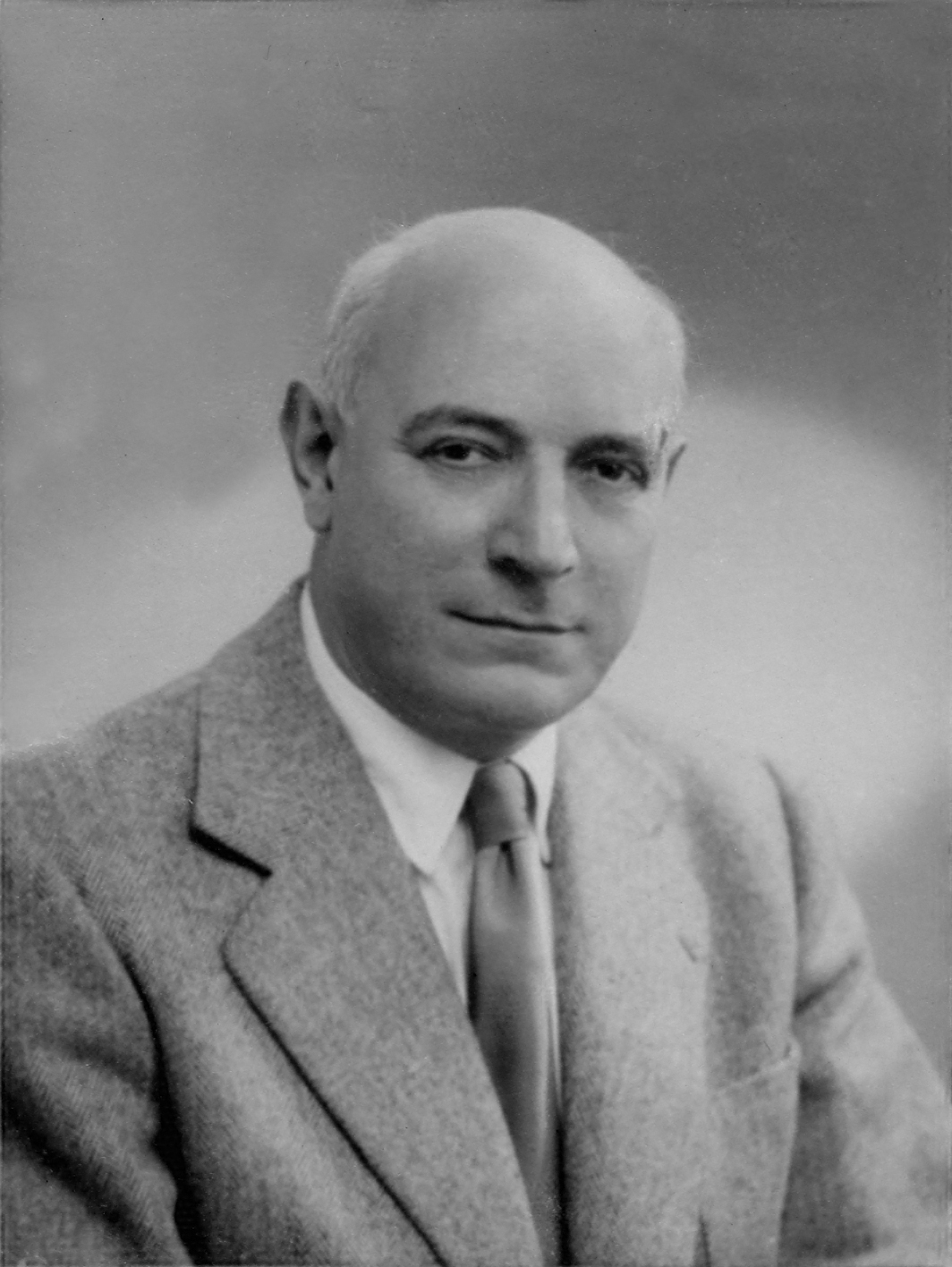
- Born: Fernand Mourlot; 5 April 1895; Paris, France
- Died: 4 December 1988 (aged 93); Paris, France
- Known for: Printmaking, lithography, publishing,
- Awards: Legion of Honour, Ordre des Arts et des Lettres, Croix de guerre 1914–1918 (France)

Fernand Mourlot (French: [fɛʁnɑ̃ muʁlo]; 5 April 1895 – 4 December 1988), son of Jules Mourlot, was the director of Mourlot Studios and founder of Editions Mourlot.

== Early life and career ==
Fernand Mourlot was born on 5 April 1895 in Paris, France. He was the sixth of nine children of Jules Mourlot and Clemence Gadras. In 1911, at the age of 16, he was admitted as a student to the École nationale supérieure des arts décoratifs where he studied drawing. After his studies he joined his father and older brothers in the family business, the "Imprimerie J. Mourlot". In 1914, Jules Mourlot, through the sale of Russian bonds, would begin expanding the studios, eventually opening a second location on rue St. Maur and purchasing Imprimerie Bataille on rue de Chabrol.

That year, the three eldest Mourlot brothers were also drafted into the French Army and sent to the front. Paul, the oldest brother, would be killed shortly after the start of the war. Georges and Fernand would remain in the army through 1918 and would both participate in many battles including the Battle of Verdun. While at the front, they would learn in 1917 of the death of their mother Clemence.

Upon their return, they rejoined their father in the business. Georges, the eldest, would head the operations of the studios, while Fernand would concentrate on the artistic side and business development. At the death of their father in 1921, the name of the studios was changed to "Mourlot Freres" (Mourlot Brothers), with Georges and Fernand heading the company, while the other siblings became minority holders in the business.

== Contribution to lithographic posters ==
In 1923, Mourlot won a contract to produce an original lithographic poster to promote an exhibition of French Modern Art in Copenhagen, Denmark. A few years later, through the friendship he had developed with the writer Georges Duhamel, himself a former veteran of World War I, Fernand Mourlot met the painter Maurice de Vlaminck. In 1926 the three men worked closely on the production of what became the first of many illustrated books printed by Mourlot Studios. 1930 marked the start of another important and long lasting cooperation: the one between Mourlot and the director of the French National Museums. That year, the Studios printed a poster for the hundred year anniversary of Romanticism and another poster to promote the retrospective of Delacroix's work at the Musée du Louvre. These were followed in 1932 by a poster for an exhibition of Édouard Manet's work at the Musée de l'Orangerie, and in 1934, a poster of Honoré Daumier's work at the Bibliothèque Nationale.

By 1937, Mourlot Studios had become the largest printer of artistic posters and was often hired by French and foreign museums, such as the Tate Gallery, to produce high quality posters for their upcoming exhibitions. That year, two more historically important posters for Pierre Bonnard and Henri Matisse would be created for the exhibition of the Art Independent at the Petit Palais. They would lead to a crucial meeting between Mourlot and Matisse and would usher the next chapter in the history of the Mourlot Studios.

== Original limited fine art prints ==
For some time, Fernand Mourlot had been inviting artists to come and work on location at the Mourlot Studios to create original graphic works of art. In previous decades they had been limited to having their work reproduced into prints by craftsmen. A few artists like Vuillard, Vlaminck and Utrillo had taken him up on the offer with successful results. But it was only through meeting Henri Matisse and subsequently, the publisher Teriade, that other major artists truly became intrigued.

In the late 1930s, the studios printed several illustrations and covers for Teriade's artistic review Verve. Through this collaboration, Fernand Mourlot would develop friendships with many of the famous artists of the time such as Fernand Léger and Georges Braque. Unfortunately, all major projects were put on hold due to the events of World War II. During the German occupation, most of the artistic and commercial production of the studios slowed considerably. Fernand Mourlot spent most of his time with the fictitious administration of other printing studios (Imprimerie Union), owned by Jewish friends and colleagues, thus avoiding the forced transfer of their assets to the state, and to the production of forged identification papers.

Still, two notable events for Mourlot would take place during those years. The first was a collaboration with the gallery owner Louis Carré that would bring works with Georges Rouault and Raoul Dufy; the other was an introduction by the writer Jean Paulhan, to the artist Jean Dubuffet and the first book publishing ventures by Fernand Mourlot in 1944, with the creation of "Les Murs", poems by Guillevic and "Matiere et Memoire" with a text by Francis Ponge.

== Post-war ==
In October 1945, encouraged by Henri Matisse and Georges Braque, Pablo Picasso meets with Fernand Mourlot. A few days after the meeting, the artist decides to dedicate himself to the lithographic medium. This first visit will last four months. With days often starting at 8:30 in the morning and finishing well after 8:00 in the evening, Picasso will thoroughly explore the lithographic process. This experience will usher in a collaboration with the Mourlot studio that would last almost three decades and produce over 400 different graphic images and editions.

Le Taureau was the initial lithograph made by Mourlot and Picasso.
