= Godefroy Engelmann =

French-German lithographer (1788–1839)

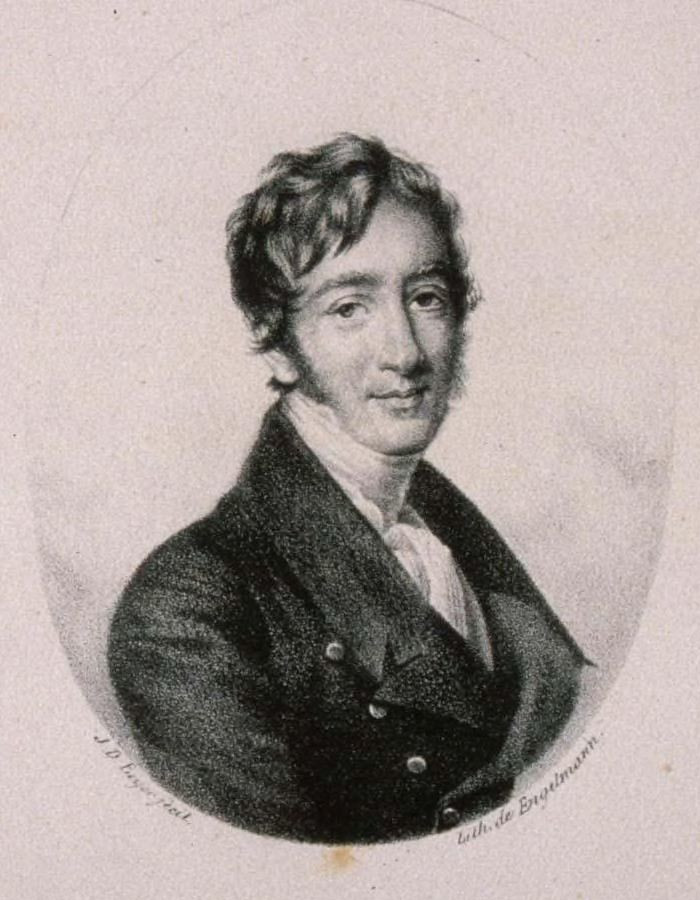
- Engelmann in 1825
- Born: August 17, 1788; Mulhouse, France
- Died: April 25, 1839 (aged 50); Mulhouse, France
- Known for: Lithography and chromolithography
- Notable work: Numerous lithographic plates for the Baron Isidore Justin Séverin Taylor edited collection of lithographs, entitled "Voyages pittoresques et romantiques dans l’ancienne France"

Godefroy Engelmann (August 17, 1788 – April 25, 1839) was a Franco-German lithographer and chromolithographer.

== Biography ==
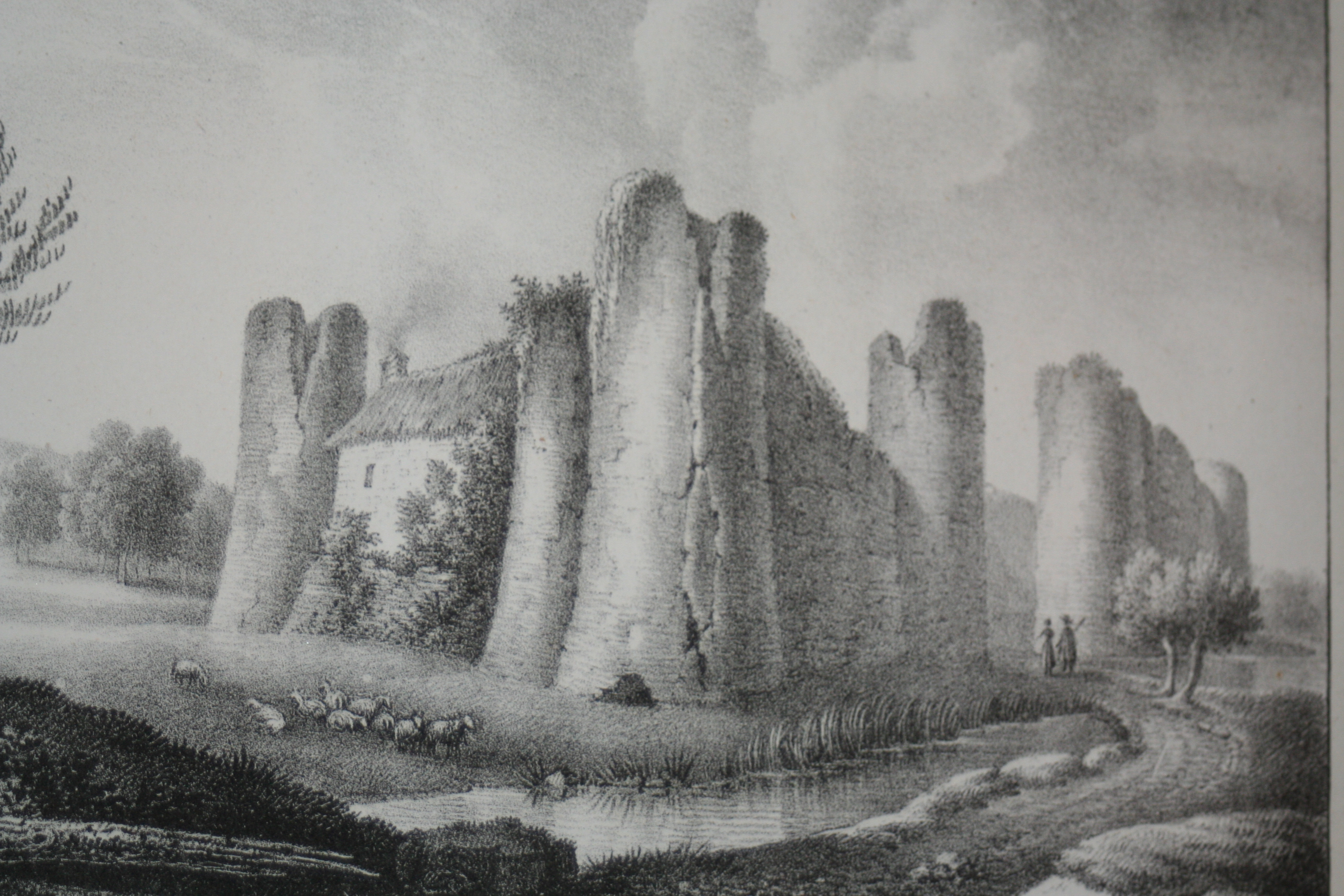
Godefroy Engelmann, Courcy Castle, lithograph, 1826

Godefroy Engelmann was born in 1788 in Mühlhausen, a small town near the France/Switzerland/Germany border. At the time of his birth Mulhouse was a free German republic associated with the Swiss Confederation, but was annexed by France 10 years later. He died in that same town in 1839, from a tumor in his neck.

Engelmann trained in Switzerland and France at La Rochelle and Bordeaux, and he studied painting and sketching in Jean-Baptiste Regnault's atelier in Paris. In the summer of 1814 he travelled to Munich, Germany to study lithography, a then-novel German invention. The following spring, he founded La Société Lithotypique de Mulhouse. In June 1816 he opened a workshop in Paris.

Engelmann is largely credited with bringing lithography to France, and later, commercializing chromolithography. In 1837 he was granted an English patent for a process of chromolithography that provided consistently high-quality results.

Throughout his life, he produced large numbers of prints, including numerous plates for Baron Isidore Justin Séverin Taylor's celebrated collection of lithographs, "Voyages pittoresques et romantiques dans l’ancienne France".

Engelmann's Paris printing company, "Engelmann et Graf" was passed on to his son, Godefroy Engelmann II (born 1819), who carried on his father's work with the same high artistic quality until his own death in 1897.
