= Lithography =

Printing technique

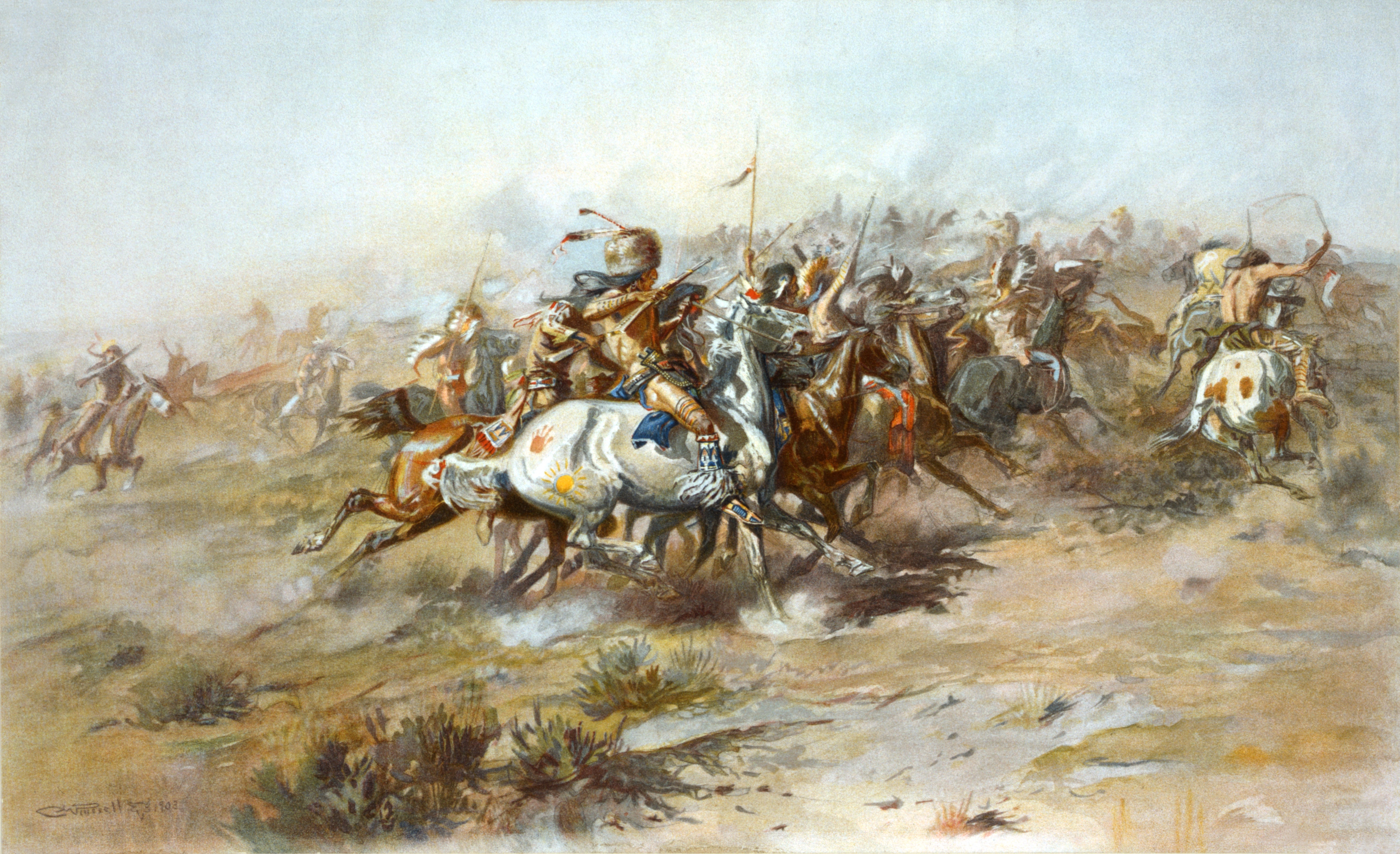
A lithograph of Charles Marion Russell's The Custer Fight (1903), with the range of tones fading toward the edges.

Lithography (from Ancient Greek λίθος (líthos) 'stone' and γράφω (gráphō) 'to write') is a planographic method of printing originally based on the immiscibility of oil and water. The printing is from a stone (lithographic limestone) or a metal plate with a smooth surface. It was invented in 1796 by the German author and actor Alois Senefelder and was initially used mostly for musical scores and maps. Lithography can be used to print text or images onto paper or other suitable material. A lithograph is something printed by lithography, but this term is only used for fine art prints and some other, mostly older, types of printed matter, not for those made by modern commercial lithography.

Traditionally, the image to be printed was drawn with a greasy substance, such as oil, fat, wax, or soap onto the surface of a smooth and flat limestone plate. The stone was then treated with a mixture of weak acid and gum arabic ("etch") that made the parts of the stone's surface that were not protected by the grease more hydrophilic (water attracting). For printing, the stone was first moistened. The water adhered only to the etched, hydrophilic areas, making them even more oil-repellant. An oil-based ink was then applied, and would stick only to the original drawing. The ink would finally be transferred to a blank sheet of paper, producing a printed page. This traditional technique is still used for fine art printmaking.

In modern commercial lithography, the image is transferred or created as a patterned polymer coating applied to a flexible plastic or metal plate. The printing plates, made of stone or metal, can be created by a photographic process, a method that may be referred to as "photolithography" (although the term usually refers to a vaguely similar microelectronics manufacturing process). Offset printing or "offset lithography" is an elaboration of lithography in which the ink is transferred from the plate to the paper indirectly by means of a rubber plate or cylinder, rather than by direct contact. This technique keeps the paper dry and allows fully automated high-speed operation. It has mostly replaced traditional lithography for medium- and high-volume printing: since the 1960s, most books and magazines, especially when illustrated in colour, are printed with offset lithography from photographically created metal plates.

As a printing technology, lithography is different from intaglio printing (gravure), wherein a plate is engraved, etched, or stippled to score cavities to contain the printing ink; and woodblock printing or letterpress printing, wherein ink is applied to the raised surfaces of letters or images.

== Principle ==
Lithography uses simple chemical processes to create an image. For instance, the positive part of an image is a water-repelling ("hydrophobic") substance, while the negative image would be water-retaining ("hydrophilic"). Thus, when the plate is introduced to a compatible printing ink and water mixture, the ink will adhere to the positive image and the water will clean the negative image. This allows a flat print plate to be used, enabling much longer and more detailed print runs than the older physical methods of printing (e.g., intaglio printing, letterpress printing).

Lithography was invented by Alois Senefelder in the Electorate of Bavaria in 1796. In the early days of lithography, a smooth piece of limestone was used (hence the name lithography: lithos (λιθος) is the Ancient Greek word for 'stone'). After the oil-based image was put on the surface, a solution of gum arabic in water was applied, the gum sticking only to the non-oily surface. During printing, water adhered to the gum arabic surfaces and was repelled by the oily parts, while the oily ink used for printing did the opposite.

=== Lithography on limestone ===
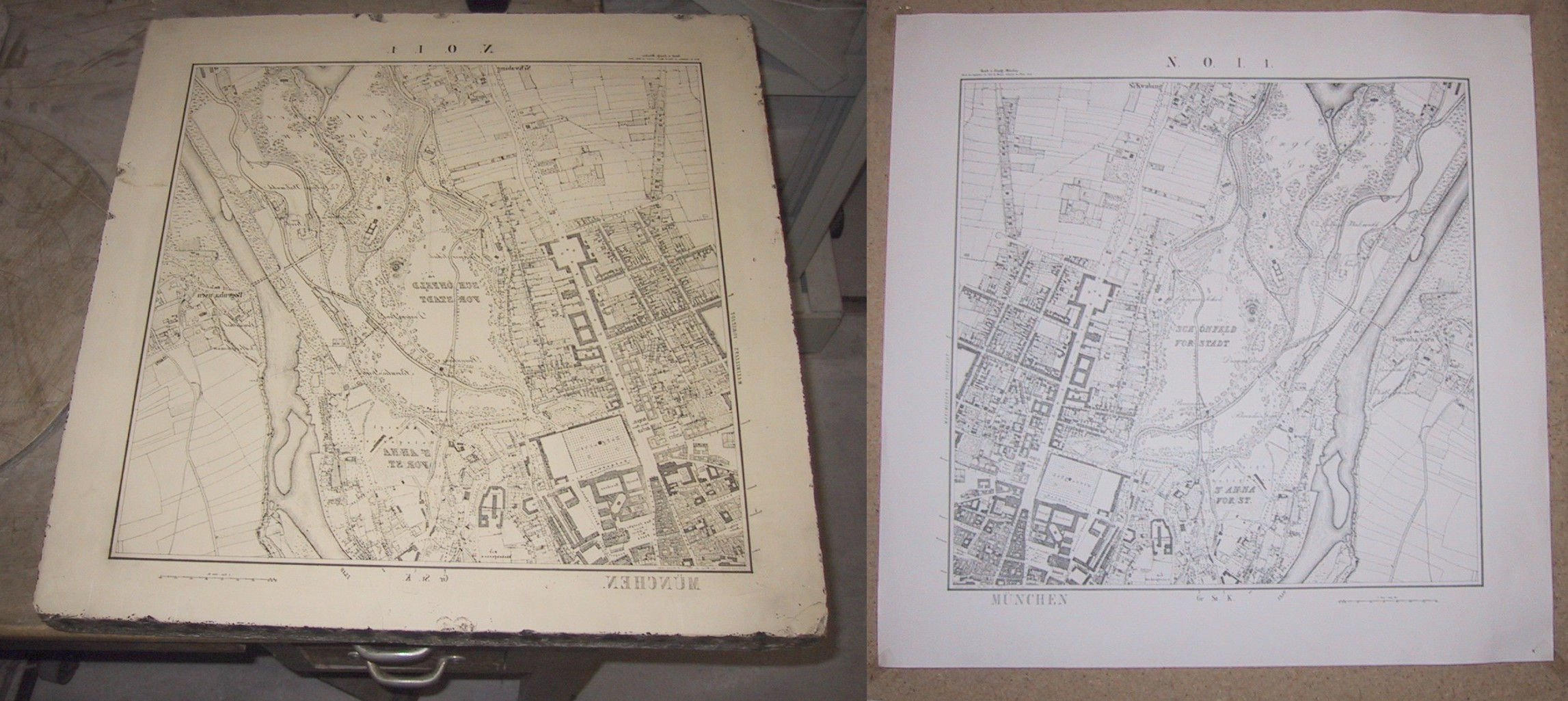
Lithography stone and mirror image print of a map of Munich

Lithography works because of the mutual repulsion of oil and water. The image is drawn on the surface of the print plate with a fat or oil-based medium (hydrophobic) such as a wax crayon, which may be pigmented to make the drawing visible. A wide range of oil-based media is available, but the durability of the image on the stone depends on the lipid content of the material being used, and its ability to withstand water and acid. After the drawing of the image, an aqueous solution of gum arabic, weakly acidified with nitric acid (HNO_{3}) is applied to the stone. The function of this solution is to create a hydrophilic layer of calcium nitrate salt, Ca(NO_{3})_{2}, and gum arabic on all non-image surfaces. The gum solution penetrates into the pores of the stone, completely surrounding the original image with a hydrophilic layer that will not accept the printing ink. Using lithographic turpentine, the printer then removes any excess of the greasy drawing material, but a hydrophobic molecular film of it remains tightly bonded to the surface of the stone, rejecting the gum arabic and water, but ready to accept the oily ink.

When printing, the stone is kept wet with water. The water is naturally attracted to the layer of gum and salt created by the acid wash. Printing ink based on drying oils such as linseed oil and varnish loaded with pigment is then rolled over the surface. The water repels the greasy ink but the hydrophobic areas left by the original drawing material accept it. When the hydrophobic image is loaded with ink, the stone and paper are run through a press that applies even pressure over the surface, transferring the ink to the paper and off the stone.

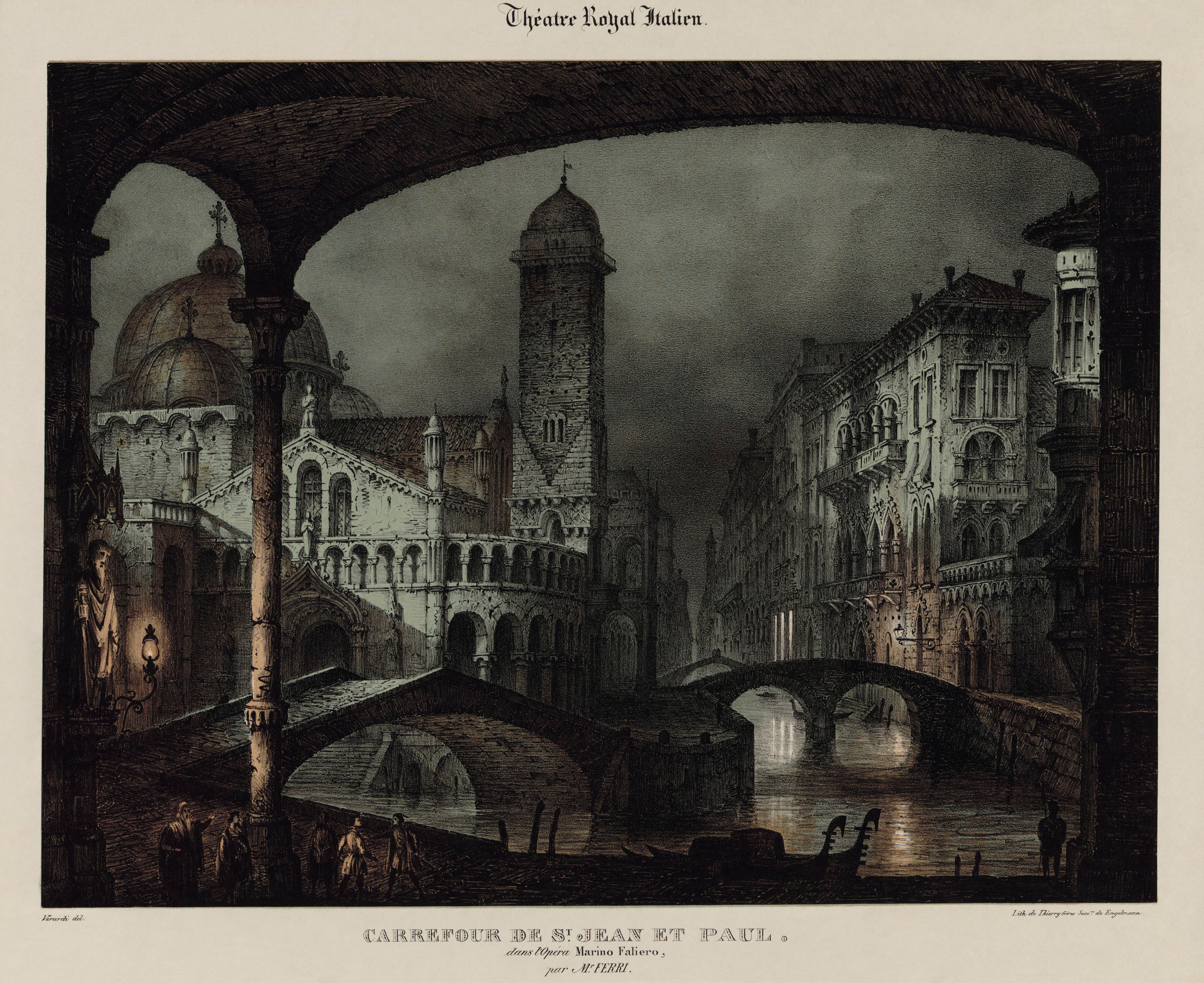
This very early colour lithograph from 1835 uses large washes of orange and cyan with black ink providing the details.

Senefelder had experimented during the early 19th century with multicolor lithography; in his 1819 book, he predicted that the process would eventually be perfected and used to reproduce paintings. Multi-color printing was introduced by a new process developed by Godefroy Engelmann (France) in 1837 known as chromolithography. A separate stone was used for each color, and a print went through the press separately for each stone. The main challenge was to keep the images aligned (in register). This method lent itself to images consisting of large areas of flat color, and resulted in the characteristic poster designs of this period.

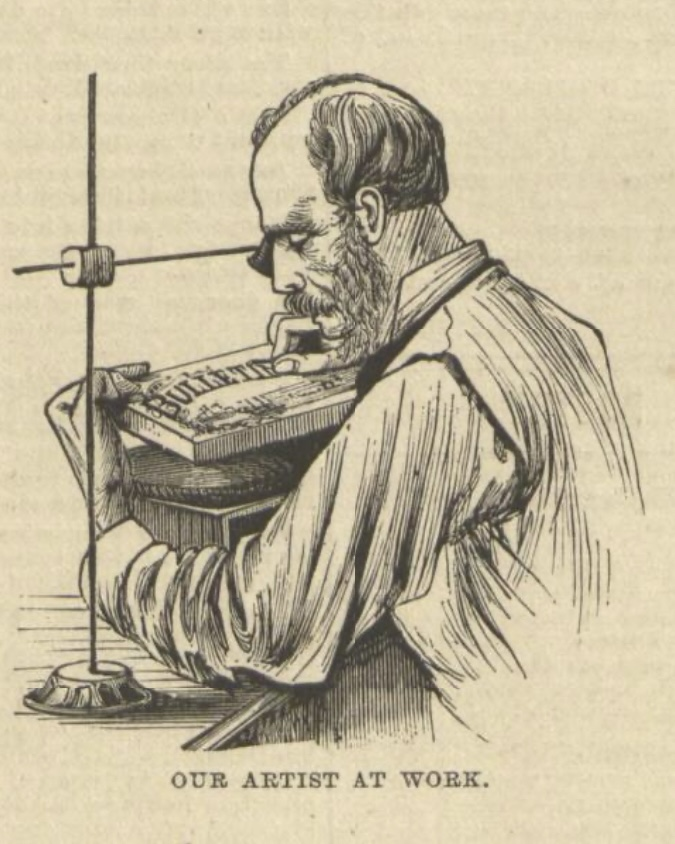
A lithographer at work, 1880.

"Lithography, or printing from soft stone, largely took the place of engraving in the production of English commercial maps after about 1852. It was a quick, cheap process and had been used to print British army maps during the Peninsular War. Most of the commercial maps of the second half of the 19th century were lithographed and unattractive, though accurate enough."

=== Modern lithographic process ===
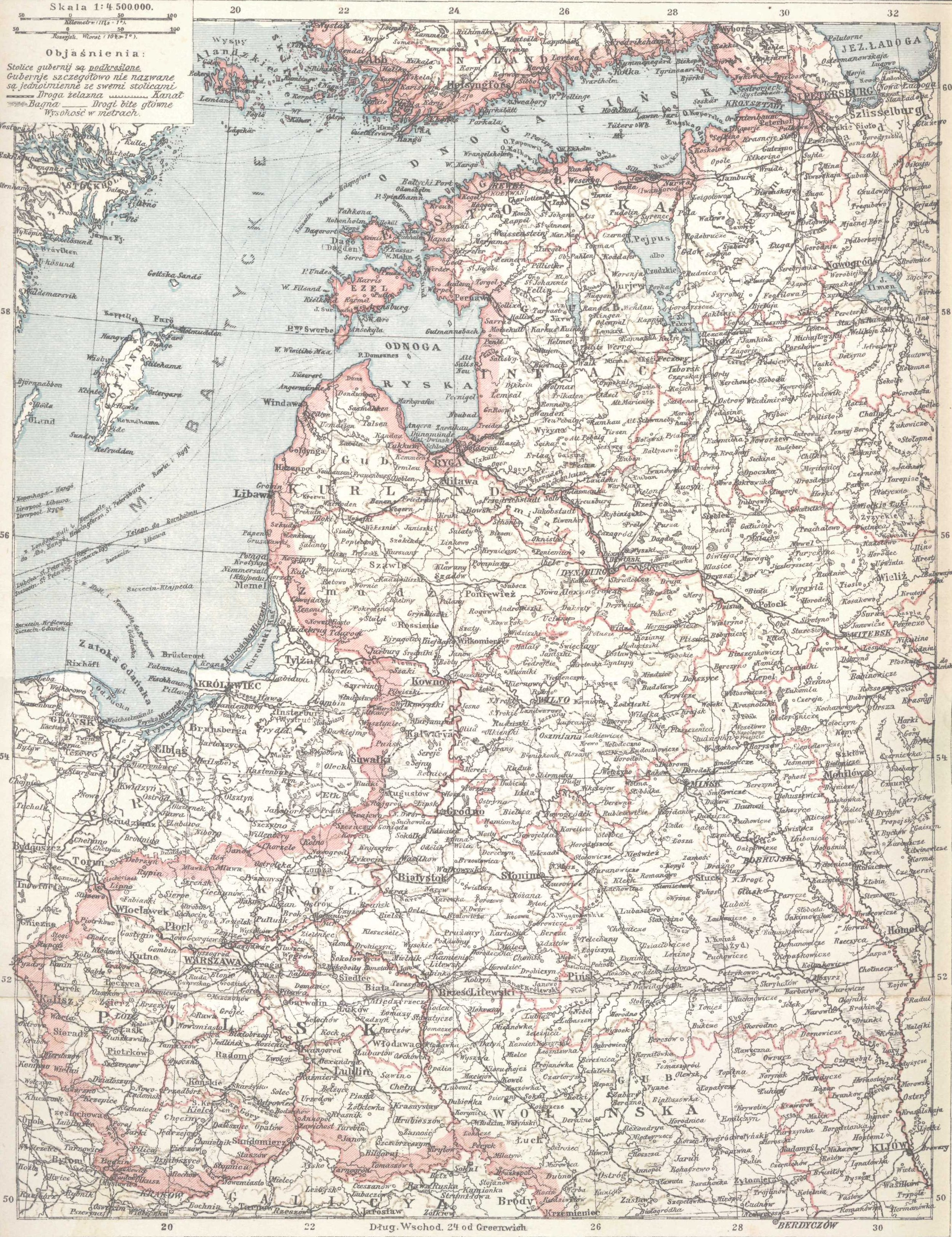
1902 Polish lithograph map of the western parts of the Russian Empire. Original size 33 cm × 24 cm (13.0 in × 9.4 in).

High-volume lithography is used to produce posters, maps, books, newspapers, and packaging—just about any smooth, mass-produced item with print and graphics on it. Most books, indeed all types of high-volume text, are printed using offset lithography.

For offset lithography, which depends on photographic processes, flexible aluminum, polyester, mylar or paper printing plates are used instead of stone tablets. Modern printing plates have a brushed or roughened texture and are covered with a photosensitive emulsion. A photographic negative of the desired image is placed in contact with the emulsion and the plate is exposed to ultraviolet light. After development, the emulsion shows a reverse of the negative image, which is thus a duplicate of the original (positive) image. The image on the plate emulsion can also be created by direct laser imaging in a CTP (computer-to-plate) device known as a platesetter. The positive image is the emulsion that remains after imaging. Non-image portions of the emulsion have traditionally been removed by a chemical process, though in recent times, plates have become available that do not require such processing.

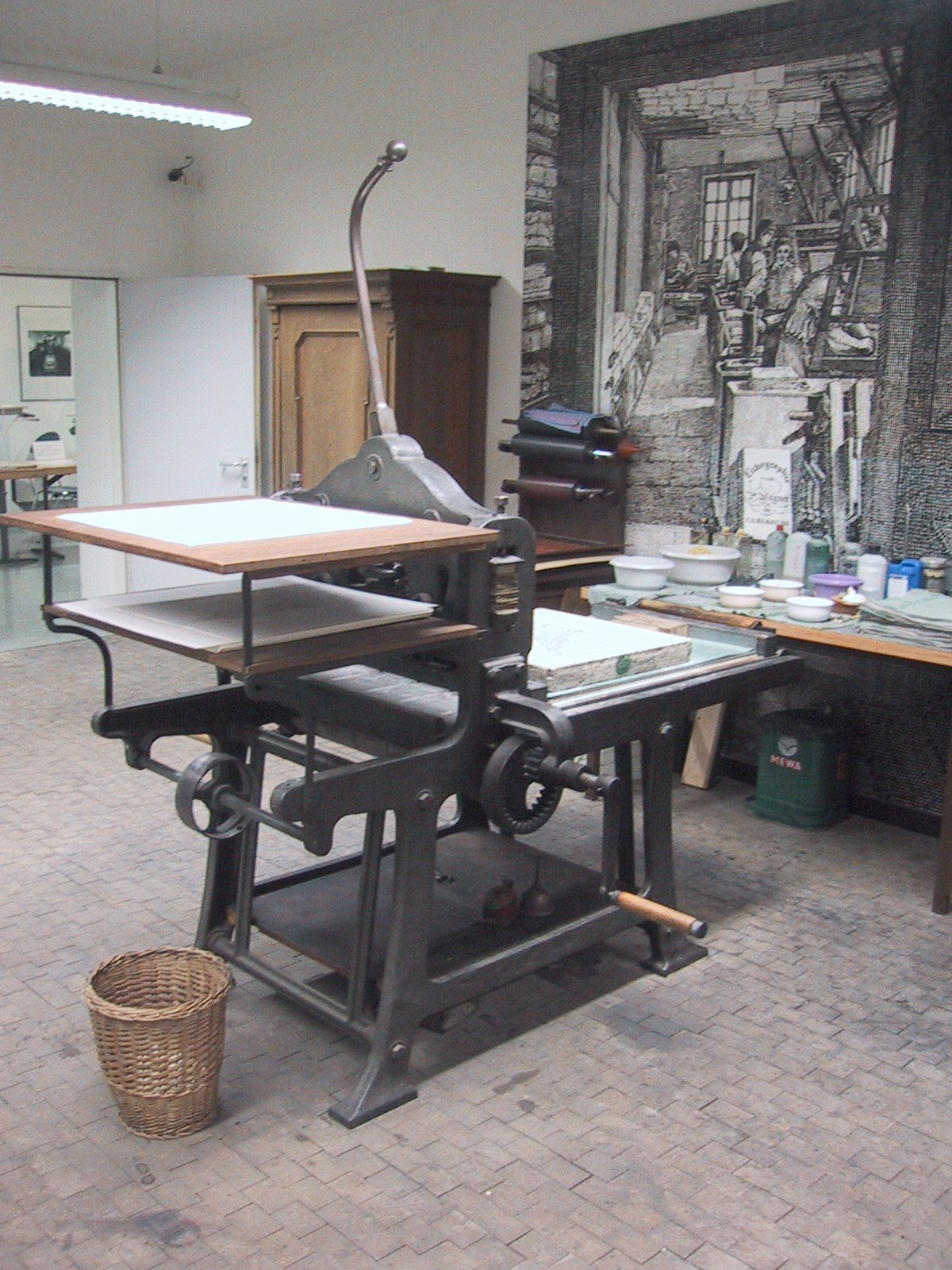
Lithography press for printing maps in Munich.

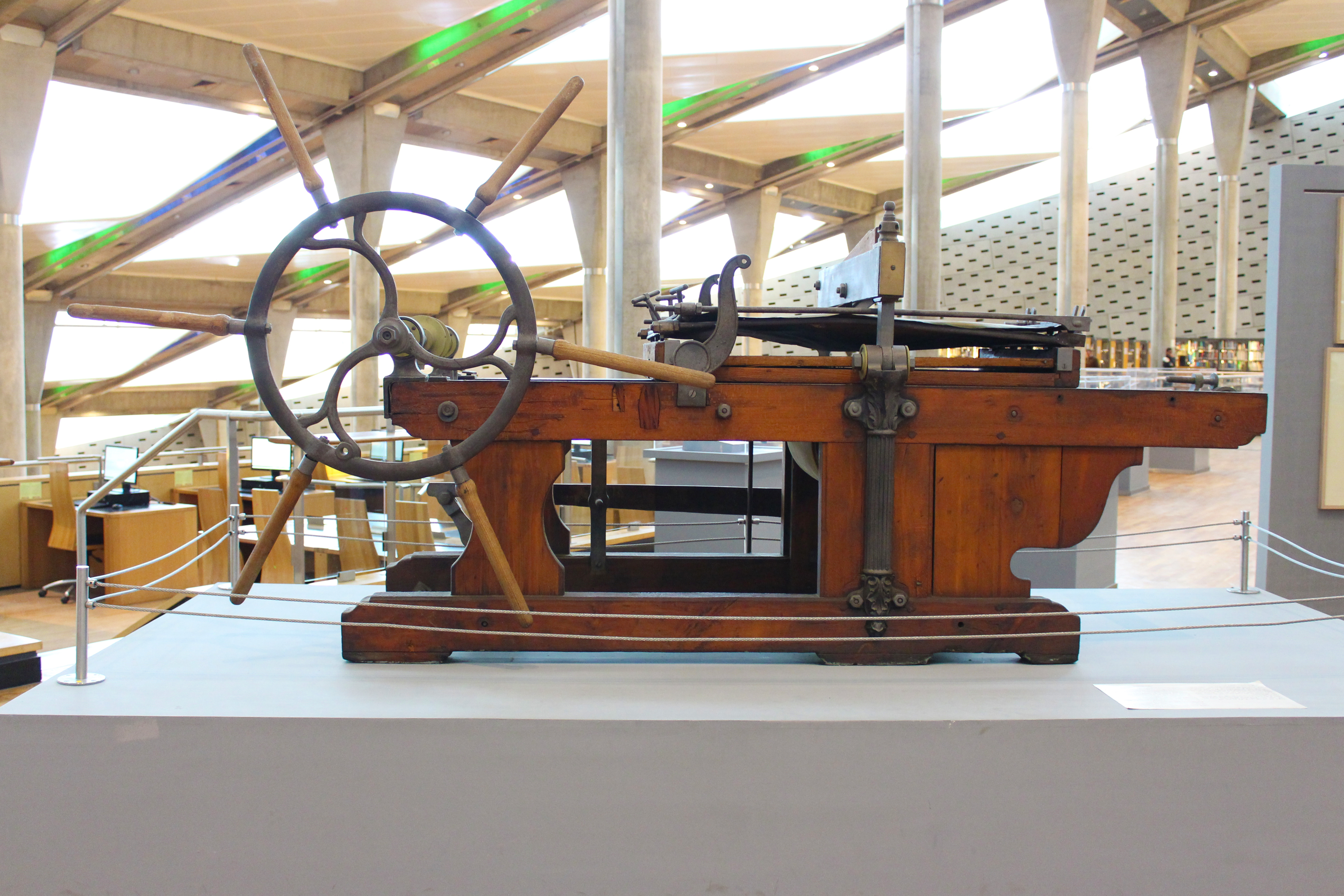
Lithography machine in Bibliotheca Alexandrina.

The plate is affixed to a cylinder on a printing press. Dampening rollers apply water, which covers the blank portions of the plate but is repelled by the emulsion of the image area. Hydrophobic ink, which is repelled by the water and only adheres to the emulsion of the image area, is then applied by the inking rollers.

If this image were transferred directly to paper, it would create a mirror-type image and the paper would become too wet. Instead, the plate rolls against a cylinder covered with a rubber blanket, which squeezes away the water, picks up the ink and transfers it to the paper with uniform pressure. The paper passes between the blanket cylinder and a counter-pressure or impression cylinder and the image is transferred to the paper. Because the image is first transferred, or offset to the rubber blanket cylinder, this reproduction method is known as offset lithography or offset printing.

Many innovations and technical refinements have been made in printing processes and presses over the years, including the development of presses with multiple units (each containing one printing plate) that can print multi-color images in one pass on both sides of the sheet, and presses that accommodate continuous rolls (webs) of paper, known as web presses. Another innovation was the continuous dampening system first introduced by Dahlgren, instead of the old method (conventional dampening) which is still used on older presses, using rollers covered with molleton (cloth) that absorbs the water. This increased control of the water flow to the plate and allowed for better ink and water balance. Recent dampening systems include a "delta effect or vario", which slows the roller in contact with the plate, thus creating a sweeping movement over the ink image to clean impurities known as "hickies".

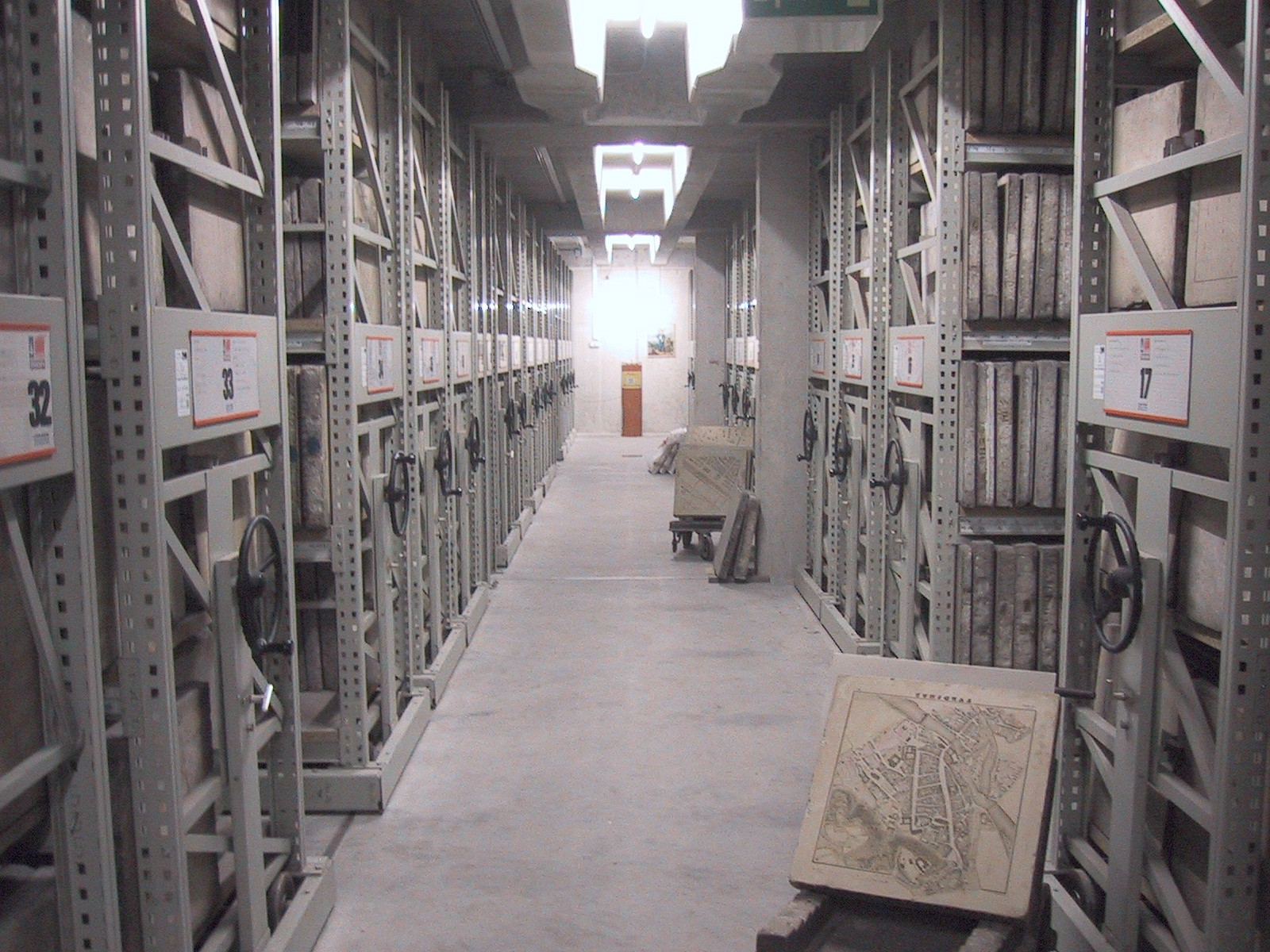
Archive of lithographic stones in Munich.

This press is also called an ink pyramid because the ink is transferred through several layers of rollers with different purposes. Fast lithographic 'web' printing presses are commonly used in newspaper production.

The advent of desktop publishing made it possible for type and images to be modified easily on personal computers for eventual printing by desktop or commercial presses. The development of digital imagesetters enabled print shops to produce negatives for platemaking directly from digital input, skipping the intermediate step of photographing an actual page layout. The development of the digital platesetter during the late 20th century eliminated film negatives altogether by exposing printing plates directly from digital input, a process known as computer-to-plate printing.

== Lithography as an artistic medium ==
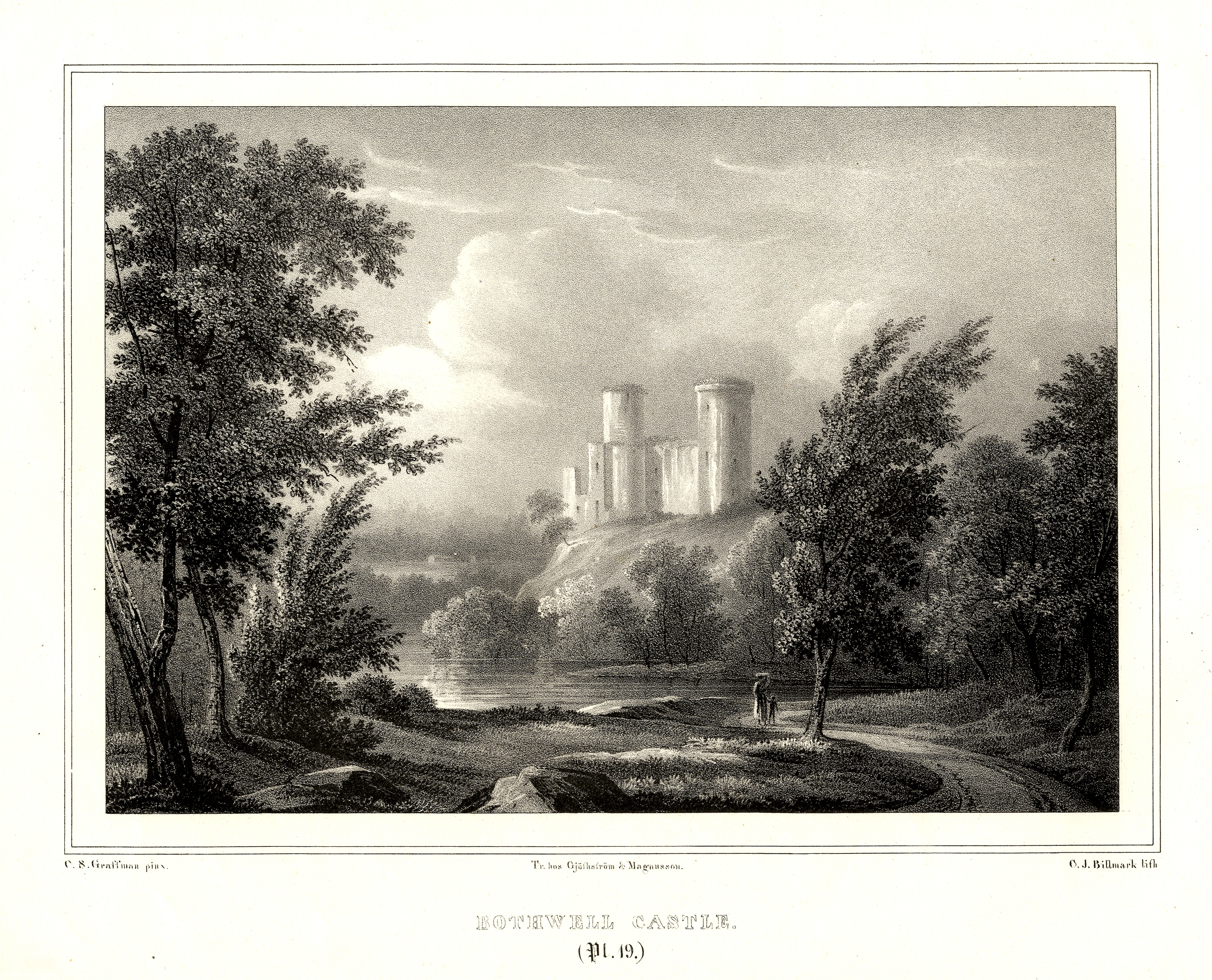
Lithographic image of Bothwell Castle near Glasgow, from 1833

During the early years of the 19th century, lithography had only a limited effect on printmaking, mainly because technical difficulties remained to be overcome. Germany was the main center of production in this period. Godefroy Engelmann, who moved his press from Mulhouse to Paris in 1816, largely succeeded in resolving the technical problems, and during the 1820s lithography was adopted by artists such as Delacroix and Géricault. After early experiments such as Specimens of Polyautography (1803), which had experimental works by a number of British artists including Benjamin West, Henry Fuseli, James Barry, Thomas Barker of Bath, Thomas Stothard, Henry Richard Greville, Richard Cooper, Henry Singleton, and William Henry Pyne, London also became a center, and some of Géricault's prints were in fact produced there. Goya in Bordeaux produced his last series of prints by lithography—The Bulls of Bordeaux of 1828. By the mid-century the initial enthusiasm had somewhat diminished in both countries, although the use of lithography was increasingly favored for commercial applications, which included the prints of Daumier, published in newspapers. Rodolphe Bresdin and Jean-François Millet also continued to practice the medium in France, and Adolph Menzel in Germany. In 1862 the publisher Cadart tried to initiate a portfolio of lithographs by various artists, which was not successful but included several prints by Manet. The revival began during the 1870s, especially in France with artists such as Odilon Redon, Henri Fantin-Latour and Degas producing much of their work in this manner. The need for strictly limited editions to maintain the price had now been realized, and the medium became more accepted.

In the 1890s, color lithography gained success in part by the emergence of Jules Chéret, known as the father of the modern poster, whose work went on to inspire a new generation of poster designers and painters, most notably Toulouse-Lautrec, and former student of Chéret, Georges de Feure. By 1900 the medium in both color and monotone was an accepted part of printmaking.

During the 20th century, a group of artists, including Braque, Calder, Chagall, Dufy, Léger, Matisse, Miró, and Picasso, rediscovered the largely undeveloped artform of lithography thanks to the Mourlot Studios, also known as Atelier Mourlot, a Parisian printshop founded in 1852 by the Mourlot family. The Atelier Mourlot originally specialized in the printing of wallpaper; but it was transformed when the founder's grandson, Fernand Mourlot, invited a number of 20th-century artists to explore the complexities of fine art printing. Mourlot encouraged the painters to work directly on lithographic stones in order to create original artworks that could then be executed under the direction of master printers in small editions. The combination of modern artist and master printer resulted in lithographs that were used as posters to promote the artists' work.

Grant Wood, George Bellows, Alphonse Mucha, Max Kahn, Pablo Picasso, Eleanor Coen, Jasper Johns, David Hockney, Susan Dorothea White, and Robert Rauschenberg are a few of the artists who have produced most of their prints in the medium. M. C. Escher is considered a master of lithography, and many of his prints were created using this process. More than other printmaking techniques, printmakers in lithography still largely depend on access to good printers, and the development of the medium has been greatly influenced by when and where these have been established. In the United States, fine art lithography was close to defunct by the late 1950s, and an artist who wanted to work in the medium generally had to print in Europe; the collaboration between artist and master printer had largely died out. June Wayne founded the Tamarind Lithography Workshop in Los Angeles in 1960, funded by the Ford Foundation, to train master printers and rebuild that collaboration; it moved to the University of New Mexico in 1970. An American scene for lithography was founded by Robert Blackburn in New York City.

== See also ==
- Block printing
- Color printing
- Electron-beam lithography
- Flexography
- German inventors and discoverers
- History of graphic design
- Lineography
- List of art techniques
- Proton beam writing, lithography using MeV ions
- Photochrom
- Photogravure
- Photolithography
- Theodore Regensteiner, inventor of the four-color lithographic press
- Rotogravure
- Stencil lithography
- Stereolithography
- Typography
