= Patrick Courrielche =

- Born: California
- Education: University of California, Los Angeles
- Occupation: Media entrepreneur
- Known for: Pop-up retail, citizen journalism
- Spouse: Adryana Cortez
- Website: redpilledamerica.com

Patrick Courrielche is an American media entrepreneur, writer, arts advocate, and podcaster. He's also known for pioneering the pop-up retail trend. He has written articles for and appeared on a variety of media outlets. His writing has led to the White House issuing new federal guidelines, and the international music industry suing a website for copyright infringement. He is the co-host and co-creator of iHeartRadio's storytelling podcast Red Pilled America.

== Career ==
While working as an applied physicist for aerospace firm TRW Inc., in 1997 Courrielche started the pop-up retail trend - or short-term sales spaces - with an event called the Ritual Expo. Initially a nightclub-meets-shopping experience, the event would eventually focus solely on creating temporary shopping experiences during the day and was initially called the "ultimate hipster mall." According to The Los Angeles Times, the event was known for attracting "style brokers" and "cultural influencers" in Los Angeles. According to Courrielche, he started his pop-up retail stores with smaller clothing manufacturers because large corporate brands did not immediately find value in the new concept. After the success of Malcolm Gladwell's book The Tipping Point that emphasized the importance of "influencers" in making a product or service cool, companies began contacting Courrielche to create pop-up stores to reach these influencers. He eventually sold the Ritual Expo to the creators of Lollapalooza and began working with Levi Strauss, AT&T, and Motorola to execute pop-up retail stores in various US cities. Courrielche is now referred to as "the parent of pop-up." He also helped launch the first Coachella by providing the festival with talent.

In 1998, Courrielche started a lifestyle marketing & PR firm, Inform Ventures, with his future wife Adryana Cortez, and in 2003 began work with Toyota launching its new youth brand Scion – considered culturally significant for its use of the arts in attracting customers. He handled Scion's public relations and promotions during the launch, created and produced several branded-entertainment films, including a 2004 docudrama featuring Questlove from The Roots and a 2007 short-film featuring Biz Markie. In 2005, he helped create and launch Scion Audio/Visual - one of the first brand-funded record labels. And in 2006, he created and produced the xPress Fest, a project that teamed film students with rock bands to make music videos. The launch was highlighted as "the most successful automotive brand launch in the history of the auto industry of North America," with several books and researchers publishing analysis on the launch for its novel approach.

Along with Cortez, Courrielche created, produced, and wrote a semi-scripted 2010 series of global warming debates between global warming proponents and environmental skeptics, and moderated by comedians Sarah Silverman, Andy Samberg, Jamie Kennedy, Tracy Morgan, and singer Mark McGrath.

In 2012, he created the first luxury automotive publicity campaign featuring a gay married couple, Simon Doonan and Jonathan Adler.

On November 1, 2018, Courrielche and his partner, Adryana Cortez, launched an iHeartRadio Original storytelling podcast called "Red Pilled America."

On November 15, 2018, Lexus opened "Intersect by Lexus New York" and acknowledged Courrielche's marketing agency, Inform Ventures, as the lead creative contributor in the creation of Intersect by Lexus – NYC and in providing programming ideas for the 16,500 square foot space.

== Writing ==
In August 2009, Courrielche participated in and recorded a National Endowment for the Arts (NEA) conference call in which the NEA's communications director, Yosi Sergant encouraged the participants (members of the media and arts community) to support the Obama administration's goals by promoting the United We Serve campaign and create art specific to areas of health care, education and the environment. The White House Office of Public Engagement also participated in the call. Courrielche criticized the NEA in a subsequent Breitbart News piece (which was published in part by The Wall Street Journal), expressing the view that the NEA was being inappropriately used for political purposes. Eleven Republican U.S. Senators criticized the conference call and questioned its legality. Melanie Sloan of the ethics group Citizens for Responsibility and Ethics in Washington said that the NEA's call was "terrible" and "inappropriate" although not a violation of federal law. Following the affair, Sergant resigned his position and the White House issued formal guidance and training for staffers "to make sure such a call never happens again." Andrew Breitbart sponsored Courrielche for a Pulitzer Prize for his series of op-eds on the NEA. In a 2017 op-ed in the 'Wall Street Journal', Courrielche advocated for the elimination of the NEA, claiming that it had become politically tainted, failed to meet its charter, had allowed the degradation of arts education in public schools, and was unable to meet the arts modern challenges. He suggested replacing the agency with an arts council that would continue necessary programs, while advising the President on legislation that he says could address what he perceives as systemic problems prohibiting it from flourishing.

Courrielche has criticized the scientific peer review process, arguing for "peer-to-peer review" instead. After the Climatic Research Unit email controversy ("Climategate") at the University of East Anglia, and claimed that the affair "triggered the death of unconditional trust in the scientific peer-review process, and the maturing of a new movement of peer-to-peer review."

In November 2019, Courrielche co-authored the book Awakenings: Moments of Truth from Middle America.
