= Mourlot Studios =

Mourlot Studios (English: /mʊərˈloʊ/ moor-LOH, French: [muʁlo]) was a commercial print shop founded in 1852 by the Mourlot family and located in Paris, France. It was also known as Imprimerie Mourlot, Mourlot Freres and Atelier Mourlot. Founded by Francois Mourlot, it started off producing wallpaper. Later, his son Jules Mourlot would expand the business to handle the production of chocolate labels for companies such as Chocolat Poulain, as well as ledgers, maps and stationery. Starting in the 1920s, Jules' son, Fernand Mourlot, converted one of the locations into a studio dedicated to printing fine art lithography.

== History ==
One of the most important contribution of the Mourlot Studio was to be the art poster. For the Eugène Delacroix exhibition in 1930, the Daumier exhibition and the Manet exhibition at the French National Museums, Mourlot became the place where posters were prepared and produced as works of art in their own right.

Another important feature would be the production of fine art, limited edition lithographs. The first painters to create lithographs at Mourlot were Vlaminck and Utrillo, despite most artists abandoning the once-popular 19th-century lithography, during the first part of the 20th century. Lithography, which was invented by Aloys Senefelder at the end of the 18th century, reached fame when it was adopted by artists such as Jules Chéret, Toulouse-Lautrec, Bonnard and Vuillard in the 1880s. Beginning in the 1930s, Fernand Mourlot (the grandson of the founder of Mourlot studios) began inviting a new generation of artists to work directly on lithography stones (in the same manner as one does when creating a poster). This expansion of fine art into the printing realm began a previously non-existent partnership between artist and printer which remains to this day.

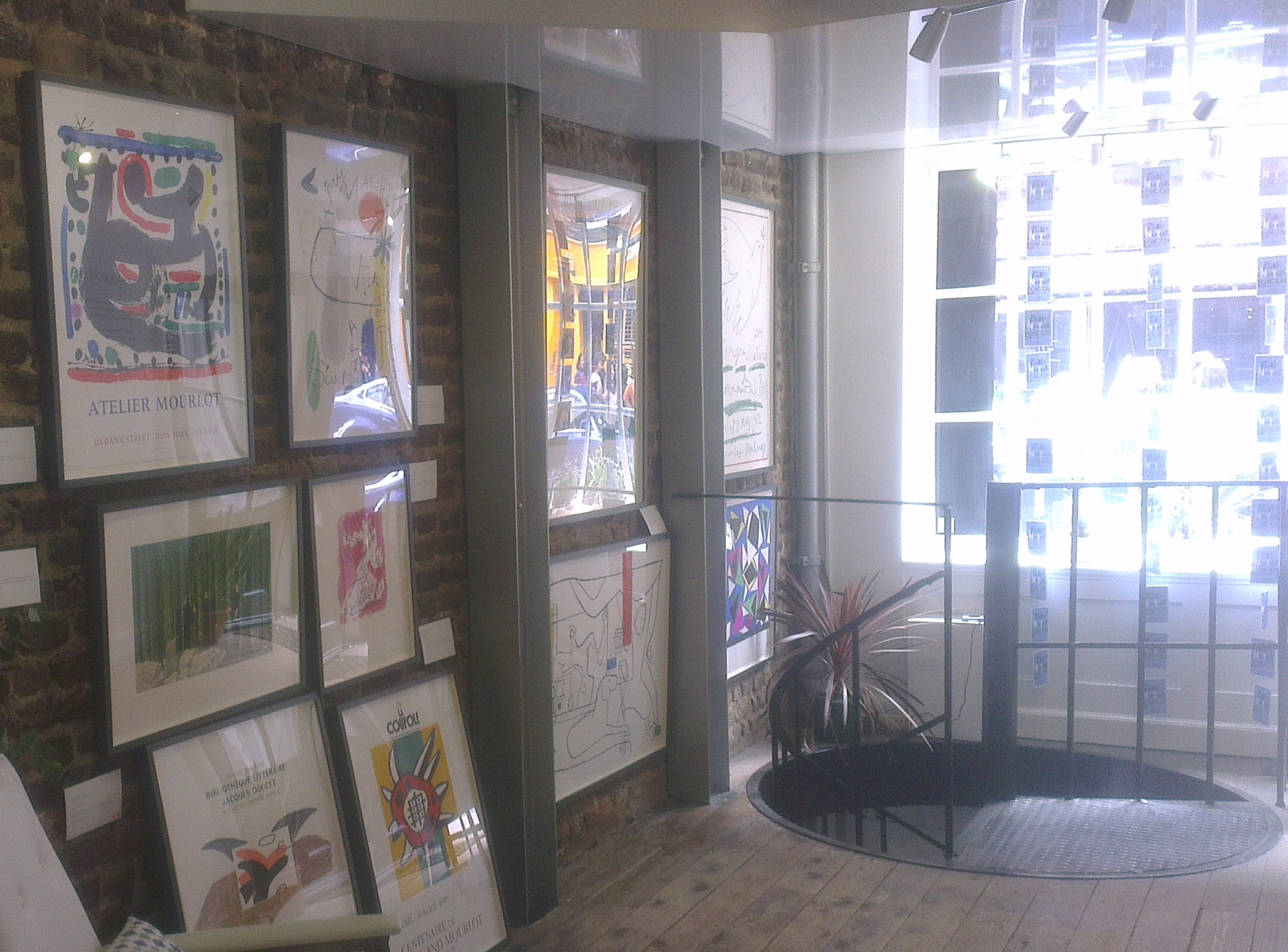
King & McGaw's 2015 Mourlot exhibit in London

In 1937, the studio created two posters, one by Bonnard and one by Henri Matisse, for the Maitres de l'Art indépendant exhibition at the Petit Palais. Both artists were so impressed by the posters' excellent quality that Mourlot studio became the leading lithographic printer for fine artwork. That same year, the studio also began a long collaboration with the editor Tériade, who founded the legendary art review "Verve." After the Second World War, Mourlot assisted Matisse, Braque, Bonnard, Rouault and Joan Miró in the creation of important lithographs for the review.

In 1945, Pablo Picasso selected the Mourlot studio for his return to the lithographic medium. Set up in a corner of the shop, it would soon become his home for several months at a time. Between 1945 and 1969, Picasso created over four hundred lithographs at Mourlot. This collaboration would break new ground in the lithographic process and lend a new dimension to Picasso's work.

In May 2015 King & McGaw used a pop-up shop to showcase lithographic posters from the Mourlot Studios archives in Soho, London. Contributions from artists such as Picasso, Matisse, Masson, Leger, Miro, Le Corbusier, Yves Klein, Raoul Dufy and René Magritte were included in the exhibit.
