= Sample sale =

Discount of excess stock at a retail business

Sample sales often take place at impromptu locations with temporary signage

Sample sales are used by retail businesses in order to discard excess merchandise. Sometimes these samples have been used by agencies to sell products that they will distribute to local vendors. Sample sales are often associated with the fashion industry. These sales are an opportunity to get near perfect merchandise at a fraction of the price. It is often difficult to have information on the date and time of sample sales, although there are websites which list information about sample sales. They are also used to draw in new clients, hoping that the new people will return to the company's store and buy more merchandise.

In the past, sample sales were a way for retailers to sell their items which were used in advanced showings, fashion shows, and presentations for interested buyers. These samples were often very limited in sizes and quantities due to the purpose the items served, but present day sample sales are often much larger in both sizes and selection. Some of the items sold at sample sales are from previous seasons, overstocked items, returned, or were never sold in stores.

Sample sales are particularly popular in the bridal industry. Bridal salons typically carry two collections per year, and so often offer their in-store sample dresses at a discount in order to make room for new bridal gowns. While bridal sample sales are most common in early summer and late fall, some stores sell sample merchandise throughout the year and even online.

Sample sale websites are a new trend expanding upon the popular brick-and-mortar (B&M) sample sales that often occur in New York, Los Angeles, and other prominent locations. Sample sale sites are usually invite-only websites that receive the opportunity to sell certain products from top labels in the fashion industry (often these items are from previous seasons, but just as often they are current products) at a heavily discounted rate. Each sample sale tends to run for about 24 to 48 hours, or until sold out; since inventory is often limited and some sites are extremely popular, some items on some sites will sell out in a matter of minutes or even seconds. Sometimes these sites place their orders for the number of products they would like ahead of time, sometimes they place their orders after receiving the customers' orders (in the latter case, shipping to you will take longer). The popularity of these sites has exploded in recent months such that many of the sites have expanded beyond fashion labels to household items, wines, and even travel. Comparatively speaking, the prices and selection are typically better than department store discount stores.

Popular bridal resource websites have sample sale calendars that alert users to upcoming sales at local bridal salons and online dress merchants. Individual bridal salons are also beginning to feature their sample dresses online, with the option of purchasing in-store or through the website.

Sample sales increased in popularity during the Great Recession because of the increasing economic challenges facing both the fashion industry and the consumer. Shoppers are advised to check their merchandise carefully before purchase, as sample sales are final.
