= Georges Braque =

French painter and sculptor (1882–1963)

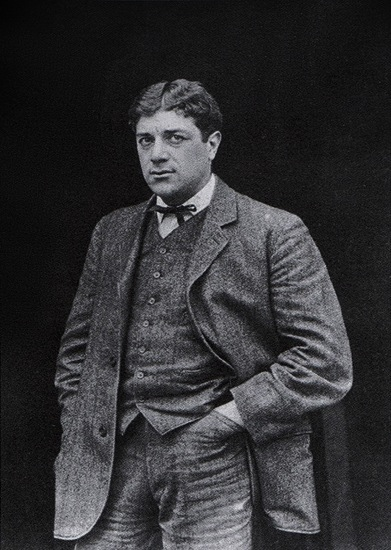
- Braque, 1908, photograph published in Burgess, "The Wild Men of Paris", Architectural Record, May 1910
- Born: 13 May 1882; Argenteuil, Val-d'Oise, France
- Died: 31 August 1963 (aged 81); Paris, France
- Resting place: L'église Saint-Valery, Varengeville-sur-mer, Normandy
- Known for: Painting, drawing, sculpture, printmaking
- Movement: Cubism, Fauvism
- Patrons: Fernand Mourlot

Georges Braque (/brɑːk, bræk/ BRA(H)K; French: [ʒɔʁʒ bʁak]; 13 May 1882 – 31 August 1963) was a major 20th-century French painter, collagist, draughtsman, printmaker and sculptor. His most notable contributions were in his alliance with Fauvism from 1905, and the role he played in the development of Cubism. Braque's work between 1908 and 1912 is closely associated with that of his colleague Pablo Picasso. Their respective Cubist works were indistinguishable for many years, yet the quiet nature of Braque was partially eclipsed by the fame and notoriety of Picasso.

== Early life ==
Georges Braque was born on 13 May 1882 in Argenteuil, Val-d'Oise. He grew up in Le Havre and trained to be a house painter and decorator like his father and grandfather. However, he also studied artistic painting during evenings at the École supérieure d'art et design Le Havre-Rouen, previously known as the École supérieure des Arts in Le Havre, from about 1897 to 1899. In Paris, he apprenticed with a decorator and was awarded his certificate in 1902. The next year, he attended the Académie Humbert, also in Paris, and painted there until 1904. It was here that he met Marie Laurencin and Francis Picabia.

== Fauvism ==
Georges Braque, 1906, L'Olivier près de l'Estaque (The Olive tree near l'Estaque). At least four versions of this scene were painted by Braque, one of which was stolen from the Musée d'Art Moderne de la Ville de Paris in May, 2010.

Georges Braque, 1907–08, The Viaduct at L'Estaque (Le Viaduc de l'Estaque), oil on canvas, 65.1 x 80.6 cm, Minneapolis Institute of Arts

Georges Braque, 1908, Maisons et arbre (Houses at l'Estaque), oil on canvas, 40.5 x 32.5 cm, Lille Métropole Museum of Modern, Contemporary and Outsider Art

Georges Braque, 1908, Le Viaduc de L'Estaque (Viaduct at L'Estaque), oil on canvas, 73 x 60 cm, Tel Aviv Museum of Art

Georges Braque, 1908, Baigneuse (Le Grand Nu, Large Nude), oil on canvas, 140 × 100 cm, Musée National d'Art Moderne, Centre Pompidou, Paris

Braque's earliest works were impressionistic, but after seeing the work exhibited by the artistic group known as the "Fauves" (Beasts) in 1905, he adopted a Fauvist style. The Fauves, a group that included Henri Matisse and André Derain among others, used brilliant colors to represent emotional response. Braque worked most closely with the artists Raoul Dufy and Othon Friesz, who shared Braque's hometown of Le Havre, to develop a somewhat more subdued Fauvist style. In 1906, Braque traveled with Friesz to L'Estaque, to Antwerp, and home to Le Havre to paint.

In May 1907, he successfully exhibited works of the Fauve style in the Salon des Indépendants. The same year, Braque's style began a slow evolution as he became influenced by Paul Cézanne who had died in 1906 and whose works were exhibited in Paris for the first time in a large-scale, museum-like retrospective in September 1907. The 1907 Cézanne retrospective at the Salon d'Automne greatly affected the avant-garde artists of Paris, resulting in the advent of Cubism.

== Cubism ==
Georges Braque, late 1909, Still Life with Metronome (Still Life with Mandola and Metronome), oil on canvas, 81 x 54.1 cm, Metropolitan Museum of Art. Gift from the Leonard A. Lauder Cubist Collection

Georges Braque, 1909–10, La guitare (Mandora, La Mandore), oil on canvas, 71.1 x 55.9 cm, Tate Modern, London

Georges Braque, 1910, Violin and Candlestick, San Francisco Museum of Modern Art

Braque's paintings of 1908–1912 reflected his new interest in geometry and simultaneous perspective. He conducted an intense study of the effects of light and perspective and the technical means that painters use to represent these effects, seeming to question the most standard of artistic conventions. In his village scenes, for example, Braque frequently reduced an architectural structure to a geometric form approximating a cube, yet rendered its shading so that it looked both flat and three-dimensional by fragmenting the image. He showed this in the painting Houses at l'Estaque.

Beginning in 1909, Braque began to work closely with Pablo Picasso who had been developing a similar proto-Cubist style of painting. At the time, Pablo Picasso was influenced by Gauguin, Cézanne, African masks and Iberian sculpture while Braque was interested mainly in developing Cézanne's ideas of multiple perspectives. "A comparison of the works of Picasso and Braque during 1908 reveals that the effect of his encounter with Picasso was more to accelerate and intensify Braque's exploration of Cézanne's ideas, rather than to divert his thinking in any essential way." Braque's essential subject is the ordinary objects he has known practically forever. Picasso celebrates animation, while Braque celebrates contemplation. Thus, the invention of Cubism was a joint effort between Picasso and Braque, then residents of Montmartre, Paris. These artists were the style's main innovators. After meeting in October or November 1907, Braque and Picasso, in particular, began working on the development of Cubism in 1908. Both artists produced paintings of monochromatic color and complex patterns of faceted form, now termed Analytic Cubism.

A decisive time of its development occurred during the summer of 1911, when Georges Braque and Pablo Picasso painted side by side in Céret in the French Pyrenees, each artist producing paintings that are difficult—sometimes virtually impossible—to distinguish from those of the other. In 1912, they began to experiment with collage and Braque invented the papier collé technique.

On 14 November 1908, the French art critic Louis Vauxcelles, in his review of Georges Braque's exhibition at Kahnweiler's gallery called Braque a daring man who despises form, "reducing everything, places and a figures and houses, to geometric schemas, to cubes".

Vauxcelles, on 25 March 1909, used the terms "bizarreries cubiques" (cubic oddities) after seeing a painting by Braque at the Salon des Indépendants.

The term 'Cubism', first pronounced in 1911 with reference to artists exhibiting at the Salon des Indépendants, quickly gained wide use but Picasso and Braque did not adopt it initially. Art historian Ernst Gombrich described Cubism as "the most radical attempt to stamp out ambiguity and to enforce one reading of the picture—that of a man-made construction, a colored canvas." The Cubist style spread quickly throughout Paris and then Europe.

The two artists' productive collaboration continued and they worked closely together until the beginning of World War I in 1914, when Braque enlisted with the French Army. In May 1915, Braque received a severe head injury in battle at Carency and suffered temporary blindness. He was trepanned, and required a long period of recuperation.

The things that Picasso and I said to one another during those years will never be said again, and even if they were, no one would understand them anymore. It was like being roped together on a mountain.

— Georges Braque

== Later work ==
Braque resumed painting in late 1916. Working alone, he began to moderate the harsh abstraction of cubism. He developed a more personal style characterized by brilliant color, textured surfaces, and—after his relocation to the Normandy seacoast—the reappearance of the human figure. He painted many still life subjects during this time, maintaining his emphasis on structure. One example of this is his 1943 work Blue Guitar, which hangs in the Allen Memorial Art Museum. During his recovery he became a close friend of the cubist artist Juan Gris.

He continued to work during the remainder of his life, producing a considerable number of paintings, graphics, and sculptures. Braque, along with Matisse, is credited for introducing Pablo Picasso to Fernand Mourlot, and most of the lithographs and book illustrations he himself created during the 1940s and '50s were produced at the Mourlot Studios. In 1952–53 he also produced The Birds, a ceiling painting for a room in the Louvre. In 1962 Braque worked with master printmaker Aldo Crommelynck to create his series of etchings and aquatints titled L'Ordre des Oiseaux (The Order of Birds), which was accompanied by the poet Saint-John Perse's text.

Braque died on 31 August 1963 in Paris. A state funeral was held in his honor in the Cour Carrée of the Louvre. He is buried in the cemetery of the Church of St. Valery in Varengeville-sur-Mer, Normandy whose windows he designed. Braque's work is in most major museums throughout the world.

== Style ==
Braque believed that an artist experienced beauty "… in terms of volume, of line, of mass, of weight, and through that beauty [he] interpret[s] [his] subjective impression..." He described "objects shattered into fragments... [as] a way of getting closest to the object...Fragmentation helped me to establish space and movement in space". He adopted a monochromatic and neutral color palette in the belief that such a palette would emphasize the subject matter.

Although Braque began his career painting landscapes, during 1908 he, alongside Picasso, discovered the advantages of painting still lifes instead. Braque explained that he "... began to concentrate on still lifes, because in the still-life you have a tactile, I might almost say a manual space... This answered to the hankering I have always had to touch things and not merely see them... In tactile space you measure the distance separating you from the object, whereas in visual space you measure the distance separating things from each other. This is what led me, long ago, from landscape to still-life" A still life was also more accessible, in relation to perspective, than landscape, and permitted the artist to see the multiple perspectives of the object. Braque's early interest in still lifes revived during the 1930s.

During the period between the wars, Braque exhibited a freer, more relaxed style of Cubism, intensifying his color use and a looser rendering of objects. However, he still remained committed to the cubist method of simultaneous perspective and fragmentation. In contrast to Picasso, who continuously reinvented his style of painting, producing both representational and cubist images, and incorporating surrealist ideas into his work, Braque continued in the Cubist style, producing luminous, other-worldly still life and figure compositions. By the time of his death in 1963, he was regarded as one of the elder statesmen of the School of Paris, and of modern art.

== 2010 theft ==
On 20 May 2010, the Musée d'Art Moderne de la Ville de Paris reported the overnight theft of five paintings from its collection. The paintings taken were Le pigeon aux petits pois (The Pigeon with the Peas) by Pablo Picasso, La Pastorale by Henri Matisse, L'Olivier Près de l'Estaque (Olive Tree near Estaque) by Georges Braque, La Femme à l'Éventail (Woman with a Fan) by Amedeo Modigliani and Nature Morte aux Chandeliers (Still Life with Chandeliers) by Fernand Léger and were valued at €100 million ($123 million USD). A window had been smashed and CCTV footage showed a masked man taking the paintings. Authorities believe the thief acted alone. The man carefully removed the paintings from their frames, which he left behind.

== Gallery ==
Georges Braque, 1908, Plate and Fruit Dish, oil on canvas, 46 × 55 cm, private collection

Georges Braque, 1908, Cinq bananes et deux poires (Five Bananas and Two Pears), oil on canvas, 24 × 33 cm, Musée National d'Art Moderne

Georges Braque, 1908, Maisons à l'Estaque (Houses at l'Estaque), oil on canvas, 73 × 59.5 cm, Kunstmuseum Bern

Georges Braque, 1908–09, Fruit Dish, oil on canvas, 54 × 65 cm, Moderna Museet, Stockholm

Georges Braque, 1909, La Roche-Guyon, le château (The Castle at Roche-Guyon), oil on canvas, 80 × 59.5 cm, Moderna Museet, Stockholm

Georges Braque, 1909 (September), Violin and Palette (Violon et palette, Dans l'atelier), oil on canvas, 91.7 × 42.8 cm, Solomon R. Guggenheim Museum

Georges Braque, 1909–10, Pitcher and Violin, oil on canvas, 116.8 × 73.2 cm, Kunstmuseum Basel

Georges Braque, 1910, Femme tenant une Mandoline, 92 × 73 cm, Bavarian State Painting Collections

Georges Braque, 1910, Portrait of a Woman, Female Figure (Torso Ženy), oil on canvas, 91 × 61 cm, private collection

Georges Braque, 1911, Nature morte (Still Life), Reproduced in Du "Cubisme", by Albert Gleizes and Jean Metzinger, 1912

Georges Braque, 1911, Nature Morte (The Pedestal Table), oil on canvas, 116.5 × 81.5 cm, Georges Pompidou Center, Paris

Georges Braque, 1911–12, Girl with a Cross, oil on canvas, 55 × 43 cm, Kimbell Art Museum, Fort Worth, Texas

Georges Braque, 1913, Femme à la guitare (Woman with Guitar), oil and charcoal on canvas, 130 × 73 cm, Musée National d'Art Moderne, Centre Pompidou, Paris

Georges Braque, 1913–14, Still Life on a Table (Duo pour Flute), oil on canvas, 45.7 × 55.2 cm, Lauder Cubist Collection, Metropolitan Museum of Art, New York

Georges Braque, 1914, Violon et verre (Violin and Glass), oil, charcoal and pasted paper on canvas, oval, 116 × 81 cm, Kunstmuseum Basel

Georges Braque, 1914, Man With a Guitar, oil on canvas, 130 × 73 cm, Musée National d'Art Moderne, Centre Georges Pompidou, Paris

Georges Braque, 1918, Rhum et guitare (Rum and Guitar), oil on canvas, 60 × 73 cm, Colección Abelló, Madrid

Georges Braque, 1927, Still Life with Grapes and Clarinet, oil on canvas, The Phillips Collection, Washington, D.C.

== See also ==
- Crystal Cubism

== References and sources ==
Sources

- Clement, Russell T. (1994). Georges Braque: A Bio-bibliography. Westport, Conn.: Greenwood Press. ISBN 978-0-313-29235-4
- Orozco, Miguel (2018) "The Complete Prints of Georges Braque. Catalogue raisonné". Academia.edu
- Fry, Edward F. (1966). "Cubism 1907-1908: An Early Eyewitness Account". Art Bulletin 48: 71–73.
- Mullins, Edwin (1968). The Art of Georges Braque. New York: Harry N. Abrams, Inc.
- Solomon R. Guggenheim Museum
- Picasso, P., Rubin, W. S., & Fluegel, J. (1980). Pablo Picasso, a retrospective. New York: Museum of Modern Art. ISBN 0-87070-528-8
