= Mourlot =

The Mourlot family (English: /mʊərˈloʊ/ moor-LOH, French: [muʁlo]) has been closely associated with the arts since 1852. The family ran Mourlot Studios, also known as Imprimerie Mourlot, Ateliers Mourlot and Mourlot Freres.

== Family members ==
- Francois Mourlot (1828–1902), lithographic printer.
- Jules Mourlot (1850–1921), son of Francois and founder of the Imprimerie Mourlot, aka. Mourlot Studios
- Fernand Mourlot(1895–1988), son of Jules, director of Mourlot Studios and founder of Editions Mourlot
- Georges Mourlot (1889), son of Jules Mourlot
- Maurice Mourlot, son of Jules Mourlot and painter
- Jeanne Mourlot, Wife of Fernand
- Roland Bennard, son of Jeanne Mourlot
- Jacques Mourlot(1933), son of Fernand and Founder of the Mourlot Studios in New York
- Nicole Bordas (1925), daughter of Fernand
- Pierre Bordas (1913–2000), Husband of Nicole and founder of the Editions Bordas, Paris
- Eric Mourlot (1970), son of Jacques and grandson of Fernand, founder of Galerie Mourlot, New York
- Frank Bordas, son of Pierre Bordas and founder of Atelier Bordas
