= Head (Csaky) =

Early Cubist sculpture created by Joseph Csaky

Head (Tête d'homme, Portrait d'homme)
- Artist: Joseph Csaky
- Year: 1913
- Type: Sculpture (original plaster)
- Location: Dimensions and whereabouts unknown (presumed destroyed)

Head, also known as Tête d'homme, or Portrait d'homme, is an early Cubist sculpture created in 1913 by the Hungarian avant-garde sculptor Joseph Csaky. This black and white photograph from the Csaky family archives (AC.111) shows a frontal view of the original 1913 plaster. Head was exhibited at Galerie Clovis Sagot, 46, rue Laffitte, Paris, 1913–14, and at the 1914 Salon des Indépendants titled Tête d'homme (n. 814 or 815). It was subsequently exhibited at Galerie Moos, Geneva, 1920, titled Buste.

The work was published in The Sun (New York City), 15 March 1914. It was then reproduced in Ricciotto Canudo's Montjoie! Montparnasse, André Salmon, numéro spécial consacré au XXXème Salon, Artistes Indépendants, 3rd issue, 18 March 1914.

The dimensions and whereabouts of Tête d'homme are unknown, and the work is presumed destroyed.

== Description ==
Joseph Csaky, Head, 1913, plaster lost; other works include Robert Delaunay, Hommage à Blériot, 1914 (Kunstmuseum Basel); Henri Ottmann, The Hat Seller, published in The Sun (New York), 15 March 1914

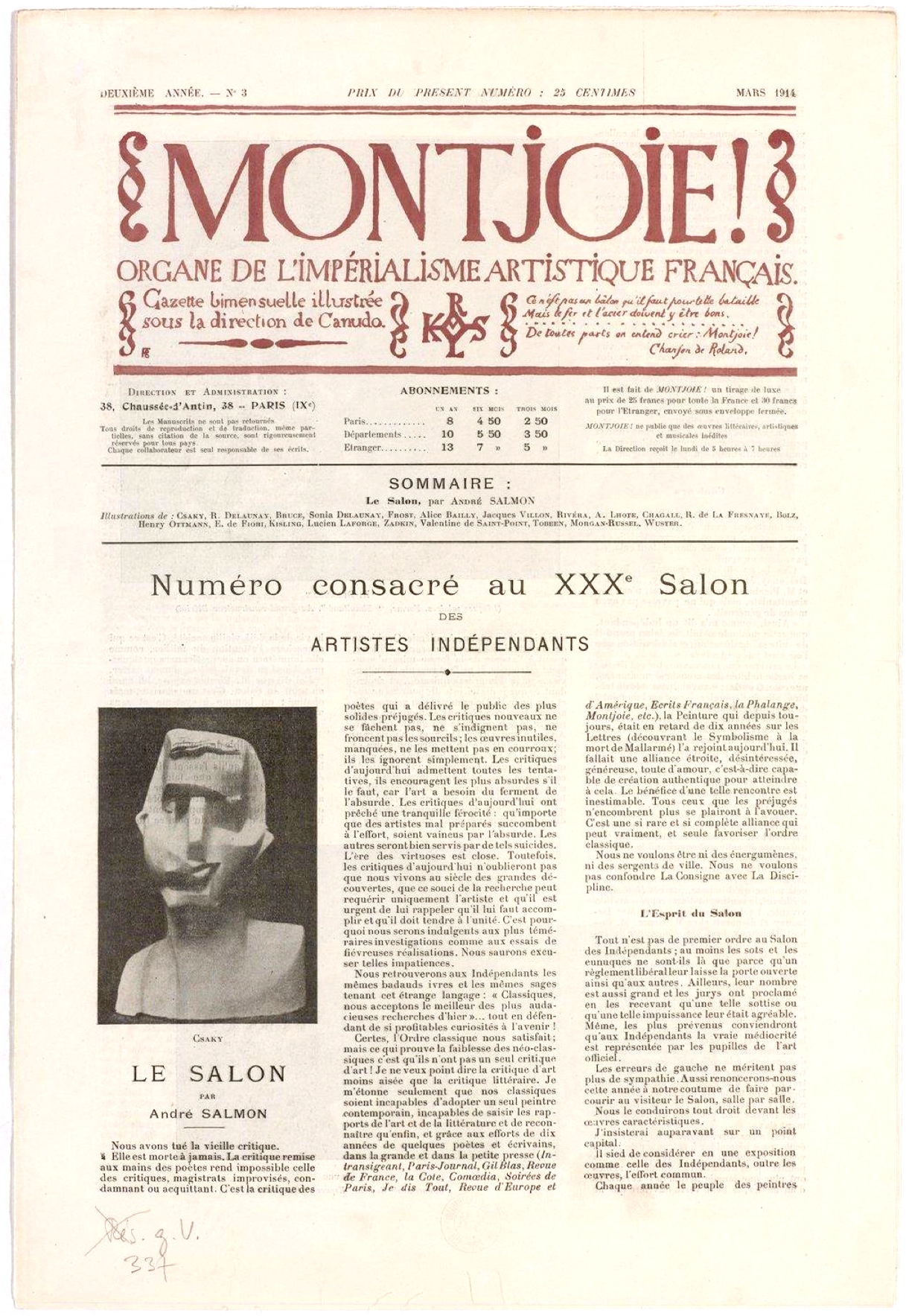
Montjoie! Ricciotto Canudo, André Salmon, Head by Joseph Csaky, 3rd issue, 18 March 1914

Head is a plaster sculpture carved in a vertical format. The work represents the bust of a man in a highly Cubist syntax, in opposition to the softness and curvilinearity of Nabis, Symbolist or Art Nouveau forms.

Csaky's heads of the period partake in the "stylized, hieratic, nonportrait tradition of tribal and ancient art", writes Edith Balas, "in which there is a total lack of interest in depicting psychological traits". Head is testimony to Csaky's early immersion in the Cubist idiom.

The subject is constructed with a grouping of faceted planar forms that together form a tight cohesive structure. The model's facial features are simply constructed with only a few surface planes juxtaposed in geometric terms at various angles. Sphericity of the head is broken by angular cuts, forming triangular (ears), rectangles (the nose) and arcs (cheekbones), visible in the photograph. The shoulders and neck form a robust base upon which the head rests. The model's hair, while treated almost realistically, is stylized and cut radically at an angle with the forehead. Only one eye is visible.

The treatment of Csaky's Tête d'homme, as other works by the artist executed between 1910 and 1914, suggest, as Albert Elsen notes, that Csaky had looked not only at Picasso's earlier painting and sculpture, but also at African tribal masks whose exaggerated features and simplified design accommodated the need to be seen at a distance and to evoke strong feeling.

Just as in Csaky's Groupe de femmes (1911–12) and Danseuse (1912), Head already shows a new way of representing the human figure, an unwillingness to revert to classical, academic or traditional methods of representation. The complex angular syntax visible in Head was born out of a growing sense of contemporary dynamism, out of rhythm, balance, harmony and out of the powerful geometric qualities of Egyptian art, African art, early Cycladic art, Gothic art, of Pierre Puvis de Chavannes, Auguste Rodin, Gustave Courbet, Paul Gauguin, Georges Seurat and Paul Cézanne, all of whom Csaky greatly admired.

== Salon des Indépendants, 1914 ==
At the Salon des Indépendants, held in Paris 1 to 30 March 1914, composed of many Orphist works of large dimension and took place in one of the largest rooms on the ground floor of the Grand Palais des Champs-Elysées: Robert Delaunay, Sonia Delaunay, Patrick Henry Bruce and Arthur Burdett Frost were largely represented.

Csaky exhibited Tête d'homme (plaster, n. 814 or 815 of the catalog), along with another bust and Danseuse (1912), executed in a highly Cubist facture. Several years later, Marcel Duchamp, speaking about his own experience during the revolutionary years in the history of art of the 20th century, presented Joseph Csaky as "belonging to a group of sculptors who, before 1914, imparted a new direction in their work. The theory of Cubism was then a trampoline that permitted the propulsion towards unexplored regions and Csaky, even if influenced by Cubism, developed his own concepts on the treatment of space. His first works appeared more theoretical and intellectual than his later works when he oriented his personal development towards atmospheric structures."

Reviewing the 1914 Indépendants in an article entitled Le Salon, published in the periodical Montjoie! and Montparnasse, André Salmon, who usually considered works the Indépendants 'true mediocrity' of the pupils of l'art officiel, encouraged his readers to visit this year's salon to discover 'true modernity'. To justify his claim he reproduce a large photograph Csaky's 1913 Head.

== Literature ==
- "André Salmon Sings the Praises of 'Independant' Painters in Paris", The Sun. (New York, N.Y.), 15 March 1914
- Montjoie! 'Montparnasse, André Salmon, numéro spécial consacré au XXXème Salon, Artistes Indépendants, 3rd issue, 18 March 1914
- René Reichard, Joseph Csaky, Frankfurt, 1988, n. 6, rep. p. 16, 20.
- Edith Balas, 1998, Joseph Csaky: A Pioneer of Modern Sculpture, American Philosophical Society. Reproduced Fig. 6, p. 24
- Félix Marcilhac, József Csáky, Du cubisme historique à la figuration réaliste, catalogue raisonné des sculptures, Les Editions de l'Amateur, Paris, 2007. rep. (1913-FM.16)
