= Joseph Csaky =

French sculptor

- Joseph Csaky in 1926
- Born: Csáky József; 18 March 1888; Szeged, Austria-Hungary
- Died: 1 May 1971 (aged 83); Paris, France
- Known for: Sculpture
- Notable work: Groupe de femmes (1911–1912), Danseuse (1912), Head (1912), Figure de Femme Debout, or Figure Habillée (1913), Head (Tête d'homme) (1913), Head (1914), Cones and Spheres (1919), Mother and Child (1926)
- Movement: Cubism, Purism, De Stijl, Abstract art, Art Deco

Joseph Csaky (also written Josef Csàky, Csáky József, József Csáky and Joseph Alexandre Csaky) (18 March 1888 – 1 May 1971) was a Hungarian avant-garde artist, sculptor, and graphic artist, best known for his early participation in the Cubist movement as a sculptor. Csaky was one of the first sculptors in Paris to apply the principles of pictorial Cubism to his art. A pioneer of modern sculpture, Csaky is among the most important sculptors of the early 20th century. He was an active member of the Section d'Or group between 1911 and 1914, and closely associated with Crystal Cubism, Purism, De Stijl, Abstract art, and Art Deco throughout the 1920s and 1930s.

Csaky fought alongside French soldiers during World War I and in 1922 became a naturalized French citizen. He was a founding member of l'Union des Artistes modernes (UAM) in 1929. During World War II, Csaky joined forces with the French underground movement (la Résistance) in Valençay. In the late 1920s, he collaborated with some other artists in designing furniture and other decorative pieces, including elements of the Studio House of the fashion designer Jacques Doucet.

After 1928, Csaky moved away from Cubism into a more figurative or representational style for nearly thirty years. He exhibited internationally across Europe, but some of his pioneering artistic innovation was forgotten. His work today is primarily held by French and Hungarian institutions, as well as museums, galleries and private collections both in France and abroad.

== Biography ==
=== Early life ===
Joseph Csaky, 1911–12, Groupe de femmes, plaster lost, photo Galerie René Reichard, Frankfurt. Exhibited at the 1912 Salon d'Automne, and Salon des Indépendants, 1913, Paris

József Csáky was born in Szeged, Hungary, then part of the dual monarchy of the Austro-Hungarian Empire. A provincial southern city, Szeged is now the third-largest in the country.

Csaky moved with his family to Budapest at an early age, where he frequented museums and galleries. In 1905, Csaky was accepted at the Academy of Applied Arts (Mintarajziskola) in Budapest, where he studied under the direction of the sculptor Mátrai Lajos, ifj. (1875–1945) for one and a half years. His interest centered around figure drawing, but, dissatisfied with the local traditional art training (which consisted of copying sculptures in plaster and modeling wild flowers out of clay), Csaky and fellow students left the school to study in the workshop of the photographer-painter László Kimnach, in Buda.

In 1907, for six and a half months, he worked in the Zsolnay Factory in Pécs, making ceramic ashtrays and vases. He worked briefly as a metal founder in Budapest, and at one point with a taxidermist. Attracted by its reputation for lights and great artists, Csaky made the decision to move to Paris, France, and did so with only forty francs in his pocket. He traveled mostly by foot, walking fifty or sixty kilometers per day during the summer of 1908. In Paris a 'new world' opened up for him. He made a living by doing odd jobs: working as a peddler, stone cutter, and posing as a model for students at a local art school, making 20 francs a week. He later posed for individual artists in their own studios, making more money and leaving plenty of time free to pursue his own work. By autumn of 1908 he shared a studio space at Cité Falguière with Joseph Brummer, a Hungarian friend who had opened the Brummer Gallery with his brothers and was studying art. Within three weeks of Csaky's arrival in Paris, Brummer showed the newcomer a sculpture he was working on: an exact copy of an African sculpture from the Congo. Brummer told Csaky that another artist in Paris, a Spaniard named Pablo Picasso, was painting in the spirit of 'Negro' sculptures.

Joseph Csaky, 1912, Danseuse (Femme à l'éventail, Femme à la cruche), original plaster, exhibited at the Salon d'Automne of 1912, Paris, n. 405, and Salon des Indépendants of 1914, n. 813, photo from Csaky archives AC.110

Joseph Csaky, Head (Tête d'homme), 1913, Plaster lost. Photo published in Montjoie! March 1914, also Richard, René, 1988

Shortly after, Csaky found a studio at the artists' collective La Ruche in Montparnasse. The building had been constructed by Gustave Eiffel, and was adapted as artists' studios by the sculptor Alfred Boucher. Among other émigré artists at La Ruche were Alexander Archipenko (who arrived in Paris the same year), Wladimir Baranoff-Rossine, and Sonia Delaunay (Terk). In the early years of the 20th century, other artists who lived there for a time included Guillaume Apollinaire, Ossip Zadkine, Moise Kisling, Marc Chagall, Max Pechstein, Fernand Léger, Jacques Lipchitz, Max Jacob, Blaise Cendrars, Chaïm Soutine, Robert Delaunay, Amedeo Modigliani, Constantin Brâncuși, and Diego Rivera, attracted to Paris from across Europe and Mexico.

With his discovery of the work of Auguste Rodin laying the groundwork for an oeuvre characterized by a mastery of sculptural techniques, Csaky's work in stone carving would evolve.

Csaky's work of this time is already distinguished by a Cubist understanding of volumetric and spatial relationships, with the integration of armature and open space, and the rhythmic use of geometry. Planes are faceted into abstract architectonic forms. His sculptural interpretation of Cubist painting is marked by elements employed in non-Western sculpture (Cycladic art, Oceanic art, the Art of ancient Egypt).

Soon Csaky and his new Parisian girlfriend Jeanne moved into a studio together on rue Didot, near the Pasteur Institute and Montparnasse Cemetery. They married.

"Thinking back on my life now," Csaky would later write, "I am amazed by the speed of the events. A few months before I had been a poor and helpless fellow who had found himself in a strange country all alone, not even speaking the language. And then, all of a sudden, from one minute to the next, I became a man with an orderly life, a place of his own and a wife, an honest, and good working woman." (Joseph Csaky)

This relationship did not last long. The two separated but continued a friendship. Csaky rented a small attic studio on rue Dalou. In 1910, Csaky won the Ferenc József Art Scholarship in Szeged, giving him enough money to attend l'Académie de La Palette, a private school in Paris where the painters Jean Metzinger, André Dunoyer de Segonzac and Henri Le Fauconnier taught. He was able to devote himself full-time to art.

=== Cubism ===
Joseph Csaky, Head (Tête d'homme), 1913, plaster lost; Robert Delaunay, Hommage à Blériot, 1914 (Kunstmuseum Basel); Henri Ottmann, The Hat Seller, published in The Sun (New York), 15 March 1914

"Csaky, after Archipenko, was the first sculptor to join the cubists, with whom he exhibited from 1911 on. They were followed by Duchamp-Villon [...] and then in 1914 by Lipchitz, Laurens and Zadkine." (Michel Seuphor)

The inspirations that led Csaky to Cubism were diverse, as they were for artists of the Bateau-Lavoir, on the one hand, or the Puteaux Group on the other. While art historians are divided on the influence of African art in the distillation of Cubism, they generally agree that Cézanne's geometric syntax was significant, as well as Seurat's approach to painting. Given a growing dissatisfaction with the classical methods of representation, and the contemporary changes—the industrial revolution, exposure to art from across the world—artists began to transform their expression.

Archipenko and Csaky—along with the Cubist sculptors who would follow—stimulated by the profound cultural changes and their own experiences, contributed their own personal artistic language.

Csaky wrote of the direction his art had taken during the crucial years:

"There was no question which was my way. True, I was not alone, but in the company of several artists who came from Eastern Europe. I joined the cubists in the Académie La Palette, which became the sanctuary of the new direction in art. On my part I did not want to imitate anyone or anything. This is why I joined the cubists movement." (Joseph Csaky)

Joseph Csaky, Deux figures, 1920, relief, limestone, polychrome, 80 cm, Kröller-Müller Museum, Otterlo, the Netherlands

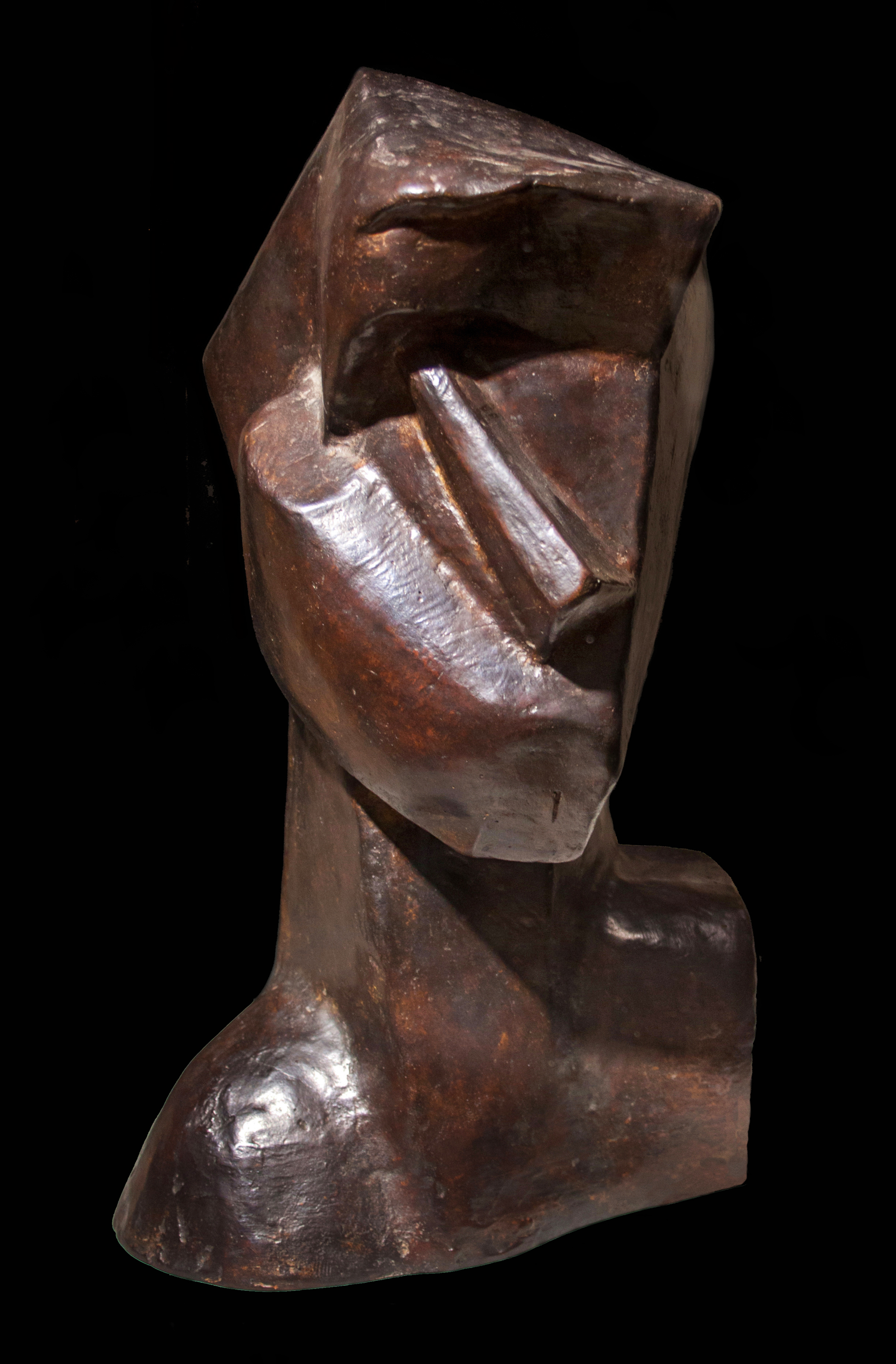
Joseph Csaky, 1914, Tête (Cubist portrait), bronze, 38.5 cm, collection MTA Foundation

Early in his artistic career, Csaky had understood that Cubism was a great liberating force. It was a means of reassessing the nature of sculpture as a four-dimensional continuum, with space, mass, plane and direction, dynamic and changing in time. It represented for him the departure from classicism, from the conventions of his predecessors.

Csaky first met Picasso at the gallery of Daniel-Henry Kahnweiler. He had already met Guillaume Apollinaire but was never as close to either of them as to Archipenko, Henri Laurens, Jacques Villon, Raymond Duchamp-Villon, and Jean Metzinger. They often met at Henri Le Fauconnier's studio on rue Notre-Dame-des-Champs, near the boulevard du Montparnasse, as well as with the Montjoie ! publisher Ricciotto Canudo, Café de la Rotonde and La Closerie des Lilas in Montparnasse.

Csaky exhibited his highly stylized 1909 sculpture, Tête de femme (Portrait de Jeanne), at the 1910 Salon de la Société Nationale des Beaux-Arts. The following year, he exhibited a proto-Cubist work entitled Mademoiselle Douell (1910).

In 1911, Csaky exhibited his Cubist sculptures at the Salon des Indépendants (21 April – 13 June) with Archipenko, Duchamp, Gleizes, Laurencin, La Fresnaye, Léger, Picabia and Metzinger. This exhibition provoked an 'involuntary scandal' out of which Cubism, brought to the attention of the general public for the first time, emerged and spread throughout Paris and beyond. Four months later Csaky exhibited at the Salon d'Automne (1 October – 8 November) together with the same artists, in addition to Modigliani, Lhote, Duchamp-Villon, Villon and František Kupka.

The following year Csaky showed with the Cubists at the 1912 Salon des Indépendants (20 March – 16 May): with Archipenko, Gleizes, La Fresnaye, Laurencin, Le Fauconnier, Léger, Lhote, Zadkine, Duchamp, Constantin Brâncuși, Wilhelm Lehmbruck, Robert Delaunay, Juan Gris, Piet Mondrian, Alfréd Réth, and Diego Rivera.

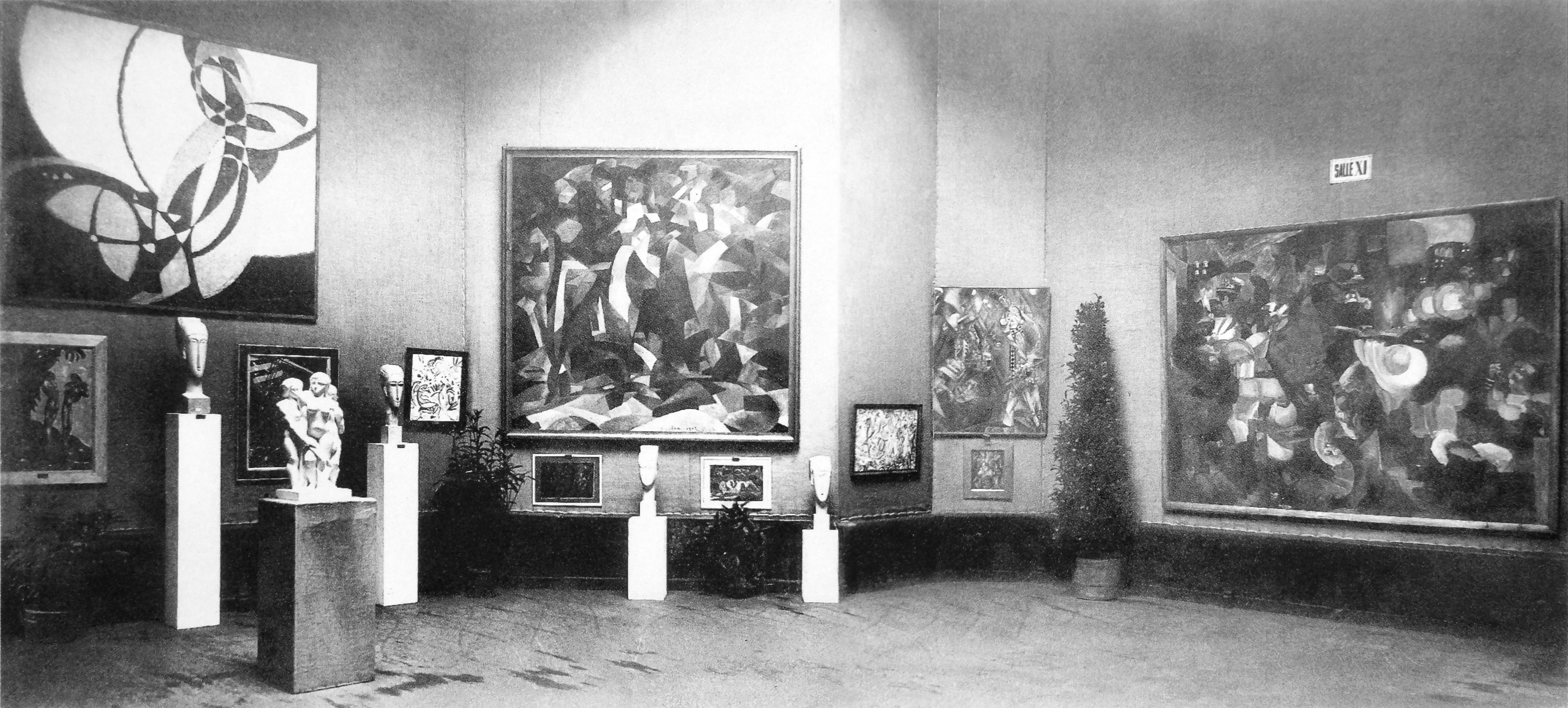
The Salon d'Automne of 1912, held in Paris at the Grand Palais from 1 October to 8 November. Csaky's sculpture Groupe de femmes (Groupe de trois femmes, Groupe de trois personnages) of 1911–12 is exhibited to the left, in front of two sculptures by Amedeo Modigliani. Other works are shown by Jean Metzinger, František Kupka, Francis Picabia and Henri Le Fauconnier.

Csaky participated in the Salon d'Automne of 1912 (1 October – 8 November) with the Cubists: Duchamp, Duchamp-Villon, Gleizes, La Fresnaye, Le Fauconnier, Léger, Lhote, Marcoussis, Metzinger, Picabia, Villon and Kupka. A rare photograph of the 1912 Salon d'Automne shows Csaky's Groupe de femmes, a sculpture now lost, exhibited in front of Kupka's Amorpha: Fugue in Two Colours and next to sculptures by Amedeo Modigliani. In the same photograph can be seen Henri Le Fauconnier's vast composition Les Montagnards attaqués par des ours (Mountaineers Attacked by Bears,) now at the Rhode Island School of Design Museum; and Francis Picabia's monumental La Source (The Spring), now at the Museum of Modern Art in New York.

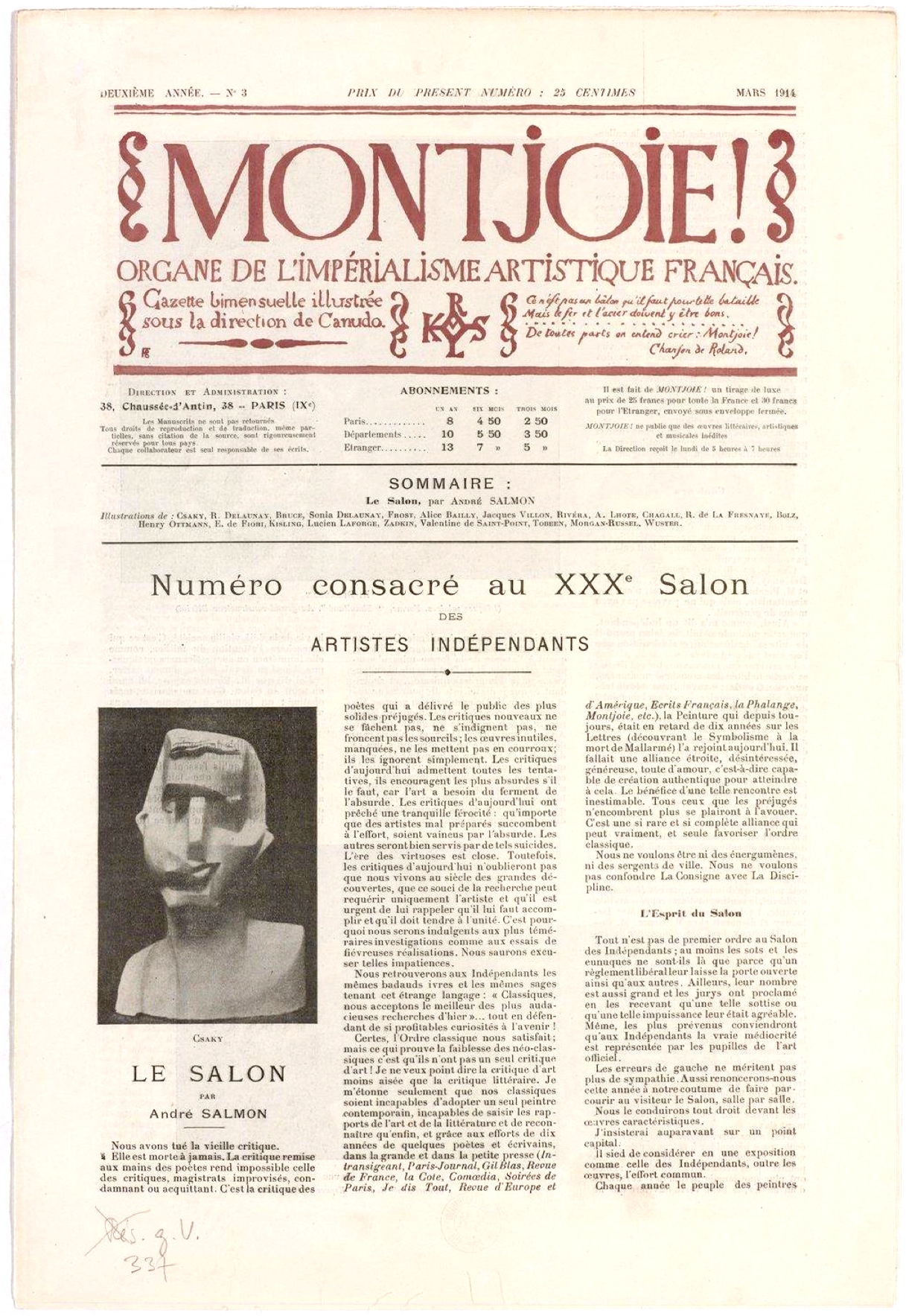
Montjoie! Ricciotto Canudo, André Salmon, Head (Tête d'homme) by Joseph Csaky reproduced, 3rd issue, 18 March 1914

Csaky exhibited as a member of Section d'Or at the Galerie La Boétie (10–30 October 1912), with Archipenko, Duchamp-Villon, La Fresnaye, Gleizes, Gris, Laurencin, Léger, Lhote, Marcoussis, Metzinger, Picabia, Kupka, Villon and Duchamp.

By this time, Csaky's participation in the avant-garde milieu was complete.

=== 1914–1918 ===
Joseph Csaky, Exhibition poster, Galerie de l'Effort Moderne, Léonce Rosenberg, 1920

"One could say that before the war, life in Paris had been like a summer day, and after the announcement of war the sky and life were darkened by weighty, heavy clouds" (Joseph Csaky)

Csaky enlisted as a volunteer in the French army and was expecting to be called in. Before joining his company, he married Marguerite Fétrié on 19 August 1914. She had become pregnant and had a child during their relationship, and Csaky wanted to become his daughter's legal father prior to his departure for what became known as World War I.

=== 1918–1928 ===
Returning to Paris after the war, Csaky began a series of works derived in part from the machine aesthetic; streamlined with geometric and mechanical affinities. By this time Csaky's artistic vocabulary had evolved: it was distinctly mature, showing a new, refined sculptural quality. Nothing in early modern sculpture in comparable to the revolutionary work Csaky produced in the years directly succeeding World War I. These were nonrepresentational free-standing objects, i.e., abstract three-dimensional constructions combining organic and geometric elements.

"Csaky derived from nature forms which were in concordance with his passion for architecture, simple, pure, and psychologically convincing." (Maurice Raynal, 1929)

The scholar Edith Balas writes of Csaky's sculpture following the war years:

"Csáky, more than anyone else working in sculpture, took Pierre Reverdy's theoretical writings on art and cubist doctrine to heart. "Cubism is an eminently plastic art; but an art of creation, not of reproduction and interpretation." The artist was to take no more than "elements" from the external world, and intuitively arrive at the "idea" of objects made up of what for him constant in value. Objects were not to be analyzed; neither were the experiences they evoked. They were to be re-created in the mind, and thereby purified. By some unexplained miracle the "pure" forms of the mind, an entirely autonomous vocabulary, of (usual geometric) forms, would make contact with the external world." (Balas, 1998, p. 27)

Joseph Csaky, ca 1920, Tête (front and side view), limestone, 60 cm, Kröller-Müller Museum, Otterlo, the Netherlands

Joseph Csaky, 1920, Tête (Head), marble, 28 cm, photograph by Léonce Rosenberg, Kröller-Müller Museum. Reproduced in Cahiers Individualistes de Philosophie et d'art, Volume 1, Number 6, December 1920.

These 1919 works (e.g., Cones and Spheres, Abstract Sculpture) are made of juxtaposing sequences of rhythmic geometric forms, where light and shadow, mass and the void, play a key role. They allude, occasionally, to the structure of the human body or modern machines, but the semblance functions only as "elements" (Reverdy) and are deprived of descriptive narrative. Csaky's polychrome reliefs of the early 1920s display an affinity with Purism—an extreme form of the Cubism aesthetic developing at the time—in their rigorous economy of architectonic symbols and the use of crystalline geometric structures.

With this intense flurry of activity, Csaky was taken on by Léonce Rosenberg, owner of the Galerie de l'Effort Moderne, 19, rue de la Baume, Paris. By 1920 Rosenberg was the sponsor, dealer and publisher of Piet Mondrian, Léger, Lipchitz and Csaky. He had just published Le Néo-Plasticisme—a collection of writings by Mondrian—and Theo van Doesburg's Classique-Baroque-Moderne. Csaky's showed a series of works at Rosenberg's gallery in December 1920.

For the following three years, Rosenberg purchased Csaky's entire artistic production. In 1921 Rosenberg organized an exhibit entitled Les maîtres du Cubisme, a group show that featured works by Csaky, Albert Gleizes, Metzinger, Mondrian, Gris, Léger, Picasso, Laurens, Georges Braque, Auguste Herbin, Gino Severini, Georges Valmier, Amédée Ozenfant and Léopold Survage.

Csaky's works of the early 1920s reflect a collective spirit of the time,

"a puritanical denial of sensuousness that reduced the cubist vocabulary to rectangles, verticals, horizontals," writes Balas, "a Spartan alliance of discipline and strength" to which Csaky adhered in his Tower Figures. "In their aesthetic order, lucidity, classical precision, emotional neutrality, and remoteness from visible reality, they should be considered stylistically and historically as belonging to the De Stijl movement." (Balas, 1998)

Joseph Csaky became a naturalized French citizen in 1922. He began to work with Marcel Coard, a dealer and gallery owner who from 1924 onward bought Csaky's sculptures in order to cast them in bronze. The two created furniture in the Art Deco style, within which sculpted elements of marble, wood and glass were integrated.

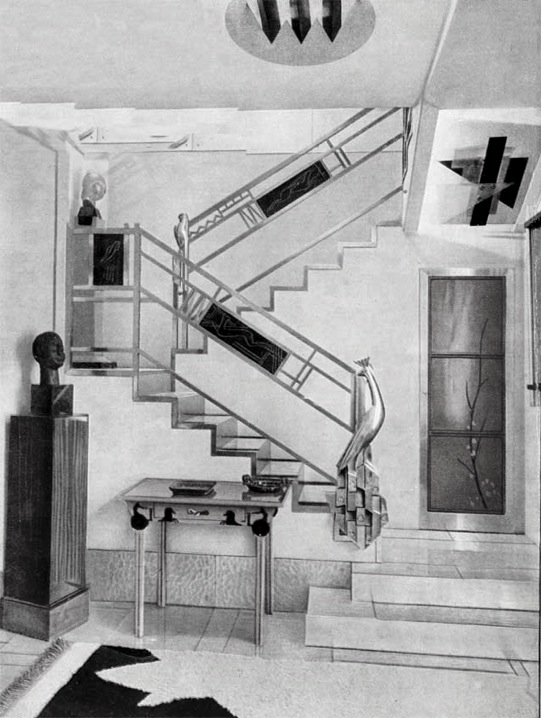
Jacques Doucet's hôtel particulier, 33 rue Saint-James, Neuilly-sur-Seine, 1929. Joseph Csaky designed Doucet's staircase, Henri Laurens the fountain, Jacques Lipchitz the fireplace mantel, and Louis Marcoussis a Cubist rug. The sculptor Gustave Miklos and others collaborated in the decoration of the studio

In 1927 Csaky collaborated with other artists, including Miklos, Jacques Lipchitz and Marcoussis, on the decoration of Studio House, rue Saint-James, Neuilly, owned by the French fashion designer Jacques Doucet. Doucet was also collecting Post-Impressionist and Cubist paintings; he bought Les Demoiselles d'Avignon directly from Picasso's studio. Csaky designed the staircase in Studio House.

=== 1928–1971, Toward figurativism ===
From 1928, while his fellow pioneers tended towards greater abstraction, Csaky moved away both from the faceted Cubism of his early Parisian epoch, and from the highly abstract or nonrepresentational intent of his post-war series. Turning towards figurative art, he no longer saw potential in abstraction.

Waldemar George, the Polish-French art critic, writes in 1930 of Csaky's departure from abstraction: "The cube, the polyhedron with right angles with its abrupt edges, are replaced by ovoids and spheres." Turning towards a more representational figuration—in a highly stylized, curvilinear and descriptive form—allowed Csaky the contact with reality, a reality that ran deeper than surface appearances. For the rest of his life, he was interested primarily in the female body in youth, a theme that expressed optimism, happiness and well-being. He was fascinated by the beauty and expressiveness of the human form in itself. He explored the subject to express his ideas and connotations attached to them. His monumental figures (although not always in sheer size) possess a timeless "amaranthine beauty, a fundamental essence relevant only to themselves."

Csaky continued exhibiting from the 1930s onwards; he was shown internationally, with shows in France, Germany, the Netherlands, Brussels, Hungary, and Luxembourg. In 1935, he traveled in Greece, an experience that shaped his artistic exploration of nudes for the remainder of his life. He had an exhibit there in 1965.

Csaky died in Paris on 1 May 1971.

== Legacy ==
Joseph Csaky contributed substantially to the development of modern sculpture, both as a pioneer in applying Cubism to sculpture, and as a leading figure in nonrepresentational art of the 1920s.

After fighting alongside the French underground movement against the Nazis during World War II, Csaky faced many difficulties: health issues, family problems and a lack of work-related commissions. Unlike many of his friends, whose names became widely known, Csaky was appreciated by fewer people (but they notably included art collectors, art historians and museum curators).

"Today, however," writes Edith Balas, "in a postmodernist atmosphere, those aspects of his art that made Csáky unacceptable to the more advanced modernists are readily accepted as valid and interesting. The time has come to give Csáky his rightful place in the ranks of the avant-garde, based on an analysis of his artistic innovations and accomplishments."

=== Art market ===
On 30 October 2017, a rock crystal and obsidian sculpture by Csaky, titled Tête (Head), was purchased at an auction at Sotheby's Paris for $1,077,004 (925,500 EUR), a world record for the artist. The 1923 work, formerly in the collection of fashion designer Jacques Doucet, had not appeared on the market since it was commissioned from the artist by Doucet.

== Selected works ==
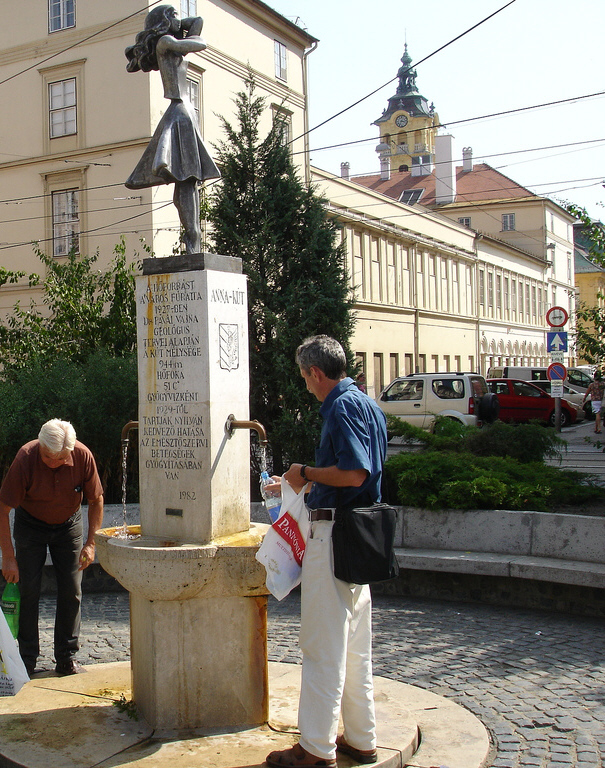
Joseph Csaky, La Danseuse (The Dancer or Táncoslány in Hungarian), 1940–1959, Public Square (Kálvin tér, Anna-Kút), Szeged, Hungary

- Femme et enfant (1909), collection Zborovsky
- Tête de femme de profil (1909), exhibited Société Nationale des Beaux-Arts, 1910, Paris
- Tête de femme de face (1909)
- Tête de femme, Portrait de Jeanne (1910)
- Tête d'homme, Autoportrait, Tête Cubiste (1911), location unknown, exhibited Salon d'Automne, 1911, Paris
- Groupe de femmes (1911–1912), location unknown, exhibited Salon d'Automne, 1912, Salon des Indépendants, 1913, Paris
- Head (1912)
- Tête de femme, Buste de femme (1912), exhibited Salon des Indépendants, 1913, Paris
- Danseuse, Femme à l'éventail, Femme à la cruche (1912), exhibited Salon d'Automne, 1912, Paris
- Figure de Femme Debout (Standing Woman), or Figure Habillée (1913), exhibited Salon des Indépendants, 1914, Paris, Musée National d'Art Moderne, and currently in the collection of Centre Georges Pompidou, Paris, Los Angeles County Museum of Art (LACMA), and Solomon Guggenheim Museum New York, acquired 1977
- Works on paper, 1913, Metropolitan Museum of Art, New York
- Head (1913) location unknown
- Head (1914), Musée National d'Art Moderne, Centre Georges Pompidou, Paris, Musée d'Art et d'Industrie de Saint-Étienne
- Cubist Composition (1919) Musée d'Art moderne et d'Art contemporain de la Ville de Liège (MAMAC)
- Cubist Head (1920)
- Deux figures (1920), Relief, Kröller-Müller Museum, Otterlo, the Netherlands
- Tête (1923), Kröller-Müller Museum, Otterlo, the Netherlands
- Mother and Child (1926)
- Mother and Young Child, (1930), stone, 160 cm: Les Musées Nationaux, circa 1950. Pétrus Faure (1891–1985), Mayor from 1947 to 1971, had this monumental sculpture placed in the Parc du Bouchet, Le Chambon-Feugerolles (believed to be its current location).
- La Danseuse, the Dancer (1940–1959), Szeged, Kálvin tér, Anna-kút public square
- Bas-Reliefs (1952), commissioned by Georges Lecompte, Ministère de l'Education Nationale, Amiens, two Bas-Reliefs by Csaky
Joseph Csaky, 1920, Deux figures, relief, sandstone, polychrome, 80 cm, Kröller-Müller Museum

Joseph Csaky, 1920, Face (Figure), limestone, 70 cm

Joseph Csaky, 1920, Tête (Tête cubiste), stone, 30 cm

Joseph Csaky, 1920 Figure (Woman), stone, approx. 80 cm, Museum of Fine Arts of Rennes

Joseph Csaky, 1921, Figure (Tête), stone, polychrome, 36 cm

Joseph Csaky, 1921, Figure, marble (white, gray, yellow), 64 cm

Joseph Csaky, 1921, Figure, stone, polychrome, 65 x 20 x 6 cm

Joseph Csaky, 1921, Tête (Tête de jeune fille, Tête d'enfant), marble (white), 21.5 cm, Musée National d'Art Moderne, Paris

Joseph Csaky, 1921, Tête (Tête de jeune fille, Tête d'enfant), marble (white), 21.5 cm, (profile), Musée National d'Art Moderne, Paris

Joseph Csaky, 1922, Femme accroupie, bronze, 50 cm, stone base, Kröller-Müller Museum

Joseph Csaky, 1922, Figure abstraite, stone, polychrome, 80 cm

Joseph Csaky, 1922, Tête (Head), marble (white, gray veins), 55 cm

== Selected exhibitions ==
Joseph Csaky, ca. 1920, Tête (Head), limestone, 60 cm, Kröller-Müller Museum, Otterlo

=== During his life ===
- Salon de la Société Nationale des Beaux-Arts, 1910–1911
- Salon d'Automne, 1911, 1912, 1945, 1949
- Salon des Indépendants, 1911, 1912, 1913, 1914, 1920, 1923
- Salon de la Section d'Or, Galerie La Boétie, Octobre 1912
- Galerie de l'Effort Moderne, Léonce Rosenberg, Les Mâitre du Cubisme, Paris, 1921, 1924
- Salon des Artistes Décorateurs, 1924
- Salon des Tuileries, 1928, 1929
- Reid & Lefevre Art Gallery, London, 1930
- Exposition de l'Union des Artistes Modernes, 1930, 1931, 1937, 1955
- Museum Heilbronn, Museum, Saarbrücken, 1932
- Galerie Casperi, München, Galerie Valentien, Stuttgart, 1933
- Ernst Múzeum, Budapest, 1936
- L'Exposition Internationale, Arts et Techniques dans la Vie moderne, (Expositions universelles de Paris), 1937
- Palais des Beaux-Arts, Brussels, Cent Ans de Sculpture Française, 1933–1939, 1940
- Volksuniversiteit, Rotterdam, the Netherlands 1949
- Centraal Museum, Utrecht, the Netherlands, 1950
- Gemeentemuseum Den Haag, the Netherlands, 1953
- Musée National d'Art Moderne, Paris, Le Cubisme, 1953
- Musée d'Art et d'Industrie de Saint-Étienne, L'Art de l'Afrique Noire, 1956
- Csáky Retrospective Exhibition (Kulturális Kapcsolatok Intézete), Budapest, Hungary, 1959
- Musée d'Art et d'Industrie de Saint-Étienne, Cent sculptures de Daumier à nos jours, 1960
- Musée d'Ixelles, Palais des beaux-arts, Charleroi, Tournai, Luxembourg, De Maillol à nos Jours: 120 sculptures et dessins du Musée National d'Art Moderne de Paris, 1960
- Athènes, Biennale en plein air, Panathénées de la Sculpture, Sept.-Nov 1965
- Deutsche Gesellschaft für bildende Kunst, Berlin, Avant-Garde, 1910–1930 Osteurops, 1967
- Minneapolis Institute of Arts, Art Deco, July–September 1971
- Metropolitan Museum of Art, New York, 1971
- Los Angeles County Museum of Art, 1971
- Museu de Arte Contemporanea de USP, São Paulo, Tendencias de Escultura Moderna, W. Zanini, 1971
- Tate Gallery, London. Léger and Purist Paris, 18 November 1970 – 24 January 1971

=== Post-humous ===
- Hayward Gallery, London, Pioneers of Modern Sculpture, 20 July – 23 September 1973
- Galerie Dépôt 15, Paris, Csaky, 15 October-30 November 1973
- Galerie des Beaux-Arts, Bordeaux, Les Cubistes, 4 May-1 September 1973
- Musée d'Art Moderne de la Ville de Paris, Les Cubistes, 26 September-10 November 1973
- Palais des Arts et de la Culture, Brest, La Sculpture et le Cubisme, 1976
- Musée Bourdelle, Trois Sculpteurs des Années 30, Gargalo-Csaky-Lambert Rucki, Juin-Sept. 1977
- Grand Palais, Paris, L'Art Moderne dans les Musée de Province, 1977
- Orangerie des Tuileries, Paris, Donation Pierre Lévy, 16 February-16 April 1978
- Musée Rodin, Paris, Formes Humaines, neuvième biennale de sculpture contemporaine – Hommage a Csaky, 3–30 June 1980
- Fondation Maeght, Saint-Paul de Vence, Sculpture du XXe siècle 1900–1945: Tradition et rupture, 4 July-4 October 1981
- Kubismus, Kunsthalle, Cologne, Germany, 1982
- Musée d'Art Moderne de la Ville de Troyes, Csaky, Sculptures Dessins, 26 Juin-15 September 1986
- Galerie René Reichard, Frankfurt, Joseph Csaky 1888–1971, Kubistische und Nachkubistische Skulpturen 1913–1950, 12/10 – 3/12 1988
- Galerie Berès, Au Temps des Cubistes, Oct. 2006 – Jan. 2007
- Solomon Guggenheim Museum New York collection, acquired 1977, and the Modern Art Gallery in Saarbrücken collection, Figure de Femme Debout, or Figure Habillée (1913)
- Musée d'Art Moderne de la Ville de Paris – MAM/ARC, L'école de Paris, 1904–1929 – La part de l'Autre, 2000
- Kröller-Müller Museum, Otterlo, Helenes Favourites, 2004
- Palazzo dei Diamanti, Ferrara (FE), Il Cubismo. Rivoluzione e tradizione, 2004
- MODEM Centre for Modern and Contemporary Arts, Debrecen, Ninety-Nine Years – The Antal-Lusztig Collection in the Modem, 2006
- Galería Leandro Navarro, Madrid, Los tiempos del Cubismo, 2007
- MODEM Centre for Modern and Contemporary Arts, Debrecen, Body language – Antal-Lusztig collection II., 2007
- Janos Gat Gallery, New York City, Hungarian Modernism, 2010
- Hollis Taggart Galleries, New York City, Modernist Works from a California Collection, 2010

== See also ==
- Crystal Cubism
- Multidimensional art
