= Danseuse (Csaky) =

Sculpture by Joseph Csaky

Danseuse (Femme à l'éventail)
- Artist: Joseph Csaky
- Year: 1912
- Type: Sculpture (original plaster). Csaky photographic archives (AC. 110)
- Location: Dimensions and whereabouts unknown (presumed destroyed)

Danseuse, also known as Femme à l'éventail, or Femme à la cruche, is an early Cubist, Proto-Art Deco sculpture created in 1912 by the Hungarian avant-garde sculptor Joseph Csaky. This black and white photograph from the Csaky family archives shows a frontal view of the original 1912 plaster. Danseuse was exhibited in Paris at the 1912 Salon d'Automne (n. 405), an exhibition that provoked a succès de scandale and resulted in a xenophobic and anti-modernist quarrel in the French National Assembly. The sculpture was then exhibited at the 1914 Salon des Indépendants entitled Femme à l'éventail (n. 813); and at Galerie Moos, Geneva, 1920, entitled Femme à la cruche.

== Description ==
Danseuse is a plaster sculpture carved in a vertical format. The work represents a woman standing or dancing nude with a folded fan in her left hand and her right knee leaning on a vase. The sculpture, known from an early photograph, is executed in a highly Cubist syntax, in opposition to the softness and curvilinearity of Nabis, Symbolist or Art Nouveau forms.

The figure, at first glance delicate, feminine, wearing a necklace, graceful with a classical allure, is constructed with a series of faceted planar forms that together form a tight cohesive structure. The head, with its stylish coiffure, and the model's facial features are simply constructed with only a few surface planes juxtaposed at seemingly right angles. Even the vase, upon close examination, appears treated in geometric terms, its sphericity broken by an angular cut to the right, barely visible in the photograph.

The treatment of Csaky's Danseuse, as other works by the artist executed between 1910 and 1913, suggests, as Albert Elsen notes, that Csaky had looked not only at Picasso's earlier painting and sculpture, but also at African tribal masks whose exaggerated features and simplified design accommodated the need to be seen at a distance and to evoke strong feeling.

Just as in Csaky's Groupe de femmes (1911–12), Danseuse already showed a new way of representing the human figure, an unwillingness to revert to classical, academic or traditional methods of representation. The complex angular syntax visible in Danseuse was born out of a growing sense of contemporary dynamism, out of rhythm, balance, harmony and out of the powerful geometric qualities of Egyptian art, African art, early Cycladic art, Gothic art, of Pierre Puvis de Chavannes, Auguste Rodin, Gustave Courbet, Paul Gauguin, Georges Seurat and Paul Cézanne, all of whom Csaky greatly admired.

== Salon d'Automne, 1912 ==
The 1912 Automne exhibition, held in Paris at the Grand Palais des Champs-Elysées from 1 October to 8 November resulted in a xenophobic and anti-modernist quarrel in the National Assembly (France). The group of artists now recognized as Cubists, among which several non-French citizens exhibited, were regrouped into the same room: Salle XI. The Cubist room was packed full with spectators, as others waited in line to get in, recalled Albert Gleizes. The resistance to both foreigners and avant-garde art was part of a more profound crises: that of defining modern French art in the wake of Impressionism centered in Paris. Placed into question was the modern ideology elaborated upon since the late 19th century. What had begun as a question of aesthetics quickly turned political during the Cubist exhibition. The critic Louis Vauxcelles (in Les Arts..., 1912) was most implicated in the deliberations. On 3 December 1912 the polemic reached the Chambre des députés and was debated at the French National Assembly.

The scandal prompted the critic Roger Allard to defend the Cubists in the journal La Côte, pointing out that it wasn't the first time the Salon d'Automne—a venue to promote modern art—came under attack by city officials, the Institute, and members of the Conseil. And it would not be the last either.

=== Works exhibited in Salle XI, the Cubist room ===
- Joseph Csaky exhibited the sculptures Danseuse (Femme à l'éventail, or Femme à la cruche) no. 405 (location unknown), Groupe de femmes, 1911-1912 (location unknown), Portrait de M.S.H., no. 91 (location unknown)
- Albert Gleizes, l'Homme au Balcon (Man on a Balcony, Portrait of Dr. Théo Morinaud) 1912 (Philadelphia Museum of Art), also exhibited at the Armory Show, New York, Chicago, Boston, 1913.
- Jean Metzinger entered three works: Dancer in a café (entitled Danseuse), La Plume Jaune (The Yellow Feather), Femme à l'Éventail (Woman with a Fan) (Solomon R. Guggenheim Museum, New York), hung in the decorative arts section inside La Maison Cubiste (the Cubist House).
- Francis Picabia, 1912, La Source (The Spring) (Museum of Modern Art, New York)
- Fernand Léger exhibited La Femme en Bleu (Woman in Blue), 1912 (Kunstmuseum, Basel) and Le passage à niveau (The Level Crossing), 1912 (Fondation Beyeler, Riehen, Switzerland)

Joseph Csaky, 1913, Tête d'homme (Head), 1913, plaster, lost or destroyed. Photo published in Montjoie, 1914, and André Salmon, Le Salon, published in Montparnasse, 1914

- Roger de La Fresnaye, Les Baigneuse (The bathers) 1912 (The National Gallery, Washington) and Les joueurs de cartes (Card Players)
- Henri Le Fauconnier, The Huntsman (Haags Gemeentemuseum, The Hague, Netherlands) and Les Montagnards attaqués par des ours (Mountaineers Attacked by Bears) 1912 (Museum of Art, Rhode Island School of Design).
- André Lhote, Le jugement de Paris, 1912 (Private collection)
- František Kupka, Amorpha, Fugue à deux couleurs (Fugue in Two Colors), 1912 (Narodni Galerie, Prague), and Amorpha Chromatique Chaude.
- Alexander Archipenko, Family Life, 1912, sculpture
- Amedeo Modigliani, exhibited four sculptures of elongated and highly stylized heads
- Raymond Duchamp-Villon, La Maison Cubiste (The Cubist House), Projet d'Hotel, Façade architecturale, 1912

== Salon des Indépendants, 1914 ==
At the Salon des Indépendants, held in Paris 1 to 30 March 1914, composed of many Orphist works of large dimension and took place in one of the largest rooms on the ground floor of the Grand Palais des Champs-Elysées: Robert Delaunay, Sonia Delaunay, Patrick Henry Bruce and Arthur Burdett Frost were largely represented.

Csaky exhibited Femme à l'éventail, plaster n. 5092 under the number 813 of the catalog, along with two busts, executed in a highly Cubist facture. Several years later, Marcel Duchamp, speaking about his own experience during the revolutionary years in the history of art of the 20th century, presented Joseph Csaky as "belonging to a group of sculptors who, before 1914, imparted a new direction in their work. The theory of Cubism was then a trampoline that permitted the propulsion towards unexplored regions and Csaky, even if influenced by Cubism, developed his own concepts on the treatment of space. His first works appeared more theoretical and intellectual than his later works when he oriented his personal development towards atmospheric structures."

Reviewing the 1914 Indépendants in an article entitled Le Salon, published in the periodical Montparnasse, André Salmon, who usually considered works the Indépendants 'true mediocrity of the pupils of l'art officiel', encouraged his readers to visit the year's salon to discover 'true modernity'. To justify his claim he reproduce a large photograph of Csaky's 1913 Head.

== Literature ==
- René Reichard, Joseph Csaky, Frankfurt, 1988, n. 12, rep. p. 23.
- Félix Marcilhac, József Csáky, Du cubisme historique à la figuration réaliste, catalogue raisonné des sculptures, Les Editions de l'Amateur, Paris, 2007. rep. (1912-FM.12)
