= Danseuse =

Danseuse is a French female term in the ballet and may refer to:

- Ballerina, sometimes taken as synonymous to a principal dancer
- Soloist, a more general term in ballet
- Corps de ballet, the group of dancers who are not soloists

Danseuse(s) may also refer to:

- Danseuse (Csaky) (1912), sculpture created by Joseph Csaky
- "Danseuses de Delphes" (1910), one of 24 piano pieces in Préludes by Claude Debussy
