= Gustave Miklos =

French sculptor

- Gustave Miklos c.1919
- Born: Miklós Gusztáv; 30 June 1888; Budapest, Hungary
- Died: 5 March 1967 (aged 78); Oyonnax, France
- Known for: Sculptor, painter, illustrator, designer
- Movement: Cubism, Art Deco

Gustave Miklos, also written Gusztáv Miklós and Miklós Gusztáv (30 June 1888, in Budapest – 5 March 1967, in Oyonnax) was a sculptor, painter, illustrator and designer of Hungarian origin. An influential sculptor involved with Cubism and early developments in Art Deco, Miklos exhibited at the Salon d'Automne and the Salon des Indépendants during the 1910s and 1920s, and in 1925 showed at the International Exposition of Modern Industrial and Decorative Arts; the exhibition from which the term "Art Deco" was derived. He became a naturalized French citizen in 1922, and a member of The French Union of Modern Artists (UAM) in 1930. In addition to his painting and sculptural works, Miklos illustrated over thirty books, designed close to 200 bookbindings, numerous posters, in addition to furniture designs.

== Early life ==
Gustave Miklos, 1921–24, Figure abstraite, gouache on paper laid down on canvas, 150 x 53 cm, private collection

Gustave Miklos was the second of four children. At age seven his teachers had already noticed his burgeoning talent, and persuaded his parents to educate their children further. From 1904 to 1906 Miklos studied under Kimnach László (1857–1906) at the Hungarian Royal National School of Arts and Crafts, where he met Joseph Csaky. A musician and music lover, he played the violin and harp. He traveled to Paris in 1909, shortly after Csaky, and settled at La Ruche in Montparnasse. Shortly thereafter Miklos exhibited at the Salon d'Automne and the Salon des Indépendants. There he formed close associations with Csaky, Archipenko and Léger, artists at the forefront of the Parisian avant-garde. While in Paris he was exposed to the works of French modernists Paul Cézanne, Georges Seurat, Paul Gauguin, and probably Henri Matisse and Pablo Picasso.

== Parisian years ==
Miklos frequented the Académie de La Palette, where he learned Cubist techniques. There he studying under Henri Le Fauconnier, and later entered the studio of Jean Metzinger. He visited the group of artists, poets and writers of the Section d'Or. Shortly after the Armory Show in New York, Miklos participated in the Exhibition of Cubist and Futurist Pictures, Boggs & Buhl Department Store, Pittsburgh, July 1913. The exhibition included works by Jean Metzinger, Albert Gleizes, Jacques Villon, Fernand Léger, Pierre Dumont and Arpad Kesmarky. Sponsored by the Gimbel Brothers department store, the Cubist and Futurist show toured Milwaukee, Cleveland, Pittsburgh, Philadelphia and New York from May through the summer of 1913. Walter Pach, knowing practically all the artists in the exhibition, probably had something to do with the organization of the show.

The following year he exhibited three paintings with the Cubists at the Salon des Indépendants in Paris. Late July 1914 he participated with Ricciotto Canudo, Joseph Csaky, Blaise Cendrars, Jean Lambert-Rucki, on a call for foreign artists to engage in the military of the side of the French. Under the pseudonym of "Rameau", Miklos is mobilized with the Armée française d'Orient, along with his friend Jean Rucki, who adopted the nickname "Lambert". During the World War I, he was posted at Bizerte, Tunisia and Salonika, Greece. There he discovered an intense color palette and ornamental richness previously unknown to him that would affect all his artistic endeavors. He was assigned with Lambert-Rucki to aerial reconnaissance missions and subsequently to the Archeological Service at the Archaeological Museum of Thessaloniki, Greece, where both Miklos and Lambert-Rucki conducted excavations. The artists Paul Jouve and Jean Goulden were also stationed in Salonika.

During the war Miklos drew in his sketchbook and painted watercolors. In February 1919 he exhibited at the Exposition des artistes d'Orient, Athens. He returned to Paris in the fall of 1919. His attic studio at Rue Saint-Jacques, Paris, was flooded by rain and many of his paintings were damaged.

Miklos further developed his technical skills at Ateliers Brugier, a lacquer workshop in Paris. In Jean Dunand's studio his interested turned towards metal panel-beating, enameling and rock-crystals. During this time he associated with the Paresian avant-garde. Subsequently, Miklos devoted most of his time to sculpture, a medium in which his style became less convoluted, purist in nature, retaining an element of mystery. Miklos personally supervised the casting of his bronzes and the application of various patinas, so that light would reflect desirably off their surfaces.

In 1921, on the initiative of the French art dealer Léonce Rosenberg, three public auctions were held over the course of two days. Many Cubist works were sold. Five works by Miklos were presented on Wednesday 19 October 1921 at the last public auction with 233 works in Amsterdam, entitled Oeuvres de l'école française moderne. Collection réunie par L'Effort Moderne (Leonce Rosenberg), Paris, L'Hotel de Ventes de Roos (sous la direction de A. Mak), Amsterdam, 1921. Also in the catalog of this auction were eight plates inserted with black and white images in a separate folder.

In 1923 Miklos exhibited in a group show at the Léonce Rosenberg's Galerie de L'Effort Moderne.

Joseph Csaky, Jacques Lipchitz and Louis Marcoussis collaborated with Miklos in 1927 on the decoration of Studio House of the French fashion designer Jacques Doucet, rue Saint-James, Neuilly. Doucet had seen the work of Miklos at the 1920 Salon des Indépendants. Doucet was also an art collector of Post-Impressionist and Cubist paintings. He purchased Les Demoiselles d'Avignon directly from Picasso's studio.

== Bibliography ==
- Gustave Miklos, le moderniste byzantin. Catalogue raisonné. Volume II: sculptures, arts décoratifs, peintures. ASIN 2954480122.
- Marcilhac, Félix (2010). Gustave Miklos and Joseph Csaky. Kálmán Makláry Fine Arts. ISBN 978-9638735089.
