= Ricciotto Canudo =

Italian film theoretician

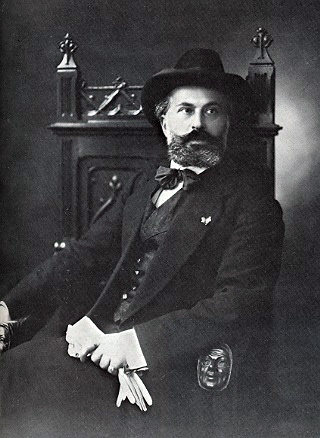
- Born: 2 January 1877; Gioia del Colle, Kingdom of Italy
- Died: 10 November 1923 (aged 46); Paris, France
- Writing career
- Subject: Film theory
- Notable work: Montjoie!

Ricciotto Canudo (French: [kanydo]; 2 January 1877 – 10 November 1923) was an early Italian film theoretician who lived primarily in France.

He saw cinema as "plastic art in motion", and gave cinema the label "the Sixth Art", later changed to "the Seventh Art", still current in French, Italian, and Spanish conceptions of art, among others. Canudo subsequently added dance as a precursor to the sixth—a third rhythmic art with music and poetry—making cinema the seventh art.

Several of Canudo's concepts found resonance with two prominent early French film experimenters—Jean Epstein and Abel Gance.

== Work ==
In his manifesto The Birth of the Sixth Art, published in 1911, Canudo argued that cinema was a new art, "a superb conciliation of the Rhythms of Space (the Plastic Arts) and the Rhythms of Time (Music and Poetry)", a synthesis of the five ancient arts: architecture, sculpture, painting, music, and poetry (cf. Hegel's Lectures on Aesthetics).

In 1913, he published a bimonthly avant-garde magazine entitled Montjoie!, promoting Cubism in particular. He wrote poetry, novels, and established open-air theatre in southern France. As an art critic, he curated a Marc Chagall exhibition in 1914. In that same year, alongside Blaise Cendrars, he issued a call for foreigners residing in France to enlist in the French army, and enlisted himself.

=== Manifesto ===
==== Paragraph 1 ====
According to the theory of the seven arts, the film falls into the category of "the seventh art" and is placed in parallel with other traditional art forms. The film theorist Ricciotto Canudo maintained that "cinema was a combination of spatial arts such as architecture, sculpture and painting and temporal arts like music, dance and poetry.

==== Paragraph 2 ====
[...] We see that in reality two arts have sprung from the human brain to permit man to stop all the fleeting experiences of life, struggling thereby against the death of aspects and forms and enriching future generations with the aesthetic experience. At the dawn of humanity, it was a question of perfecting life by elevating it above ephemeral realities, by affirming the eternity of things which stir men. Men wanted to create hearths of emotion capable of spreading over all generations what an Italian philosopher called "aesthetic oblivion" - that is to say, an enjoyment of life superior to life - of a multiple personality by which each person could transcend himself. [...]

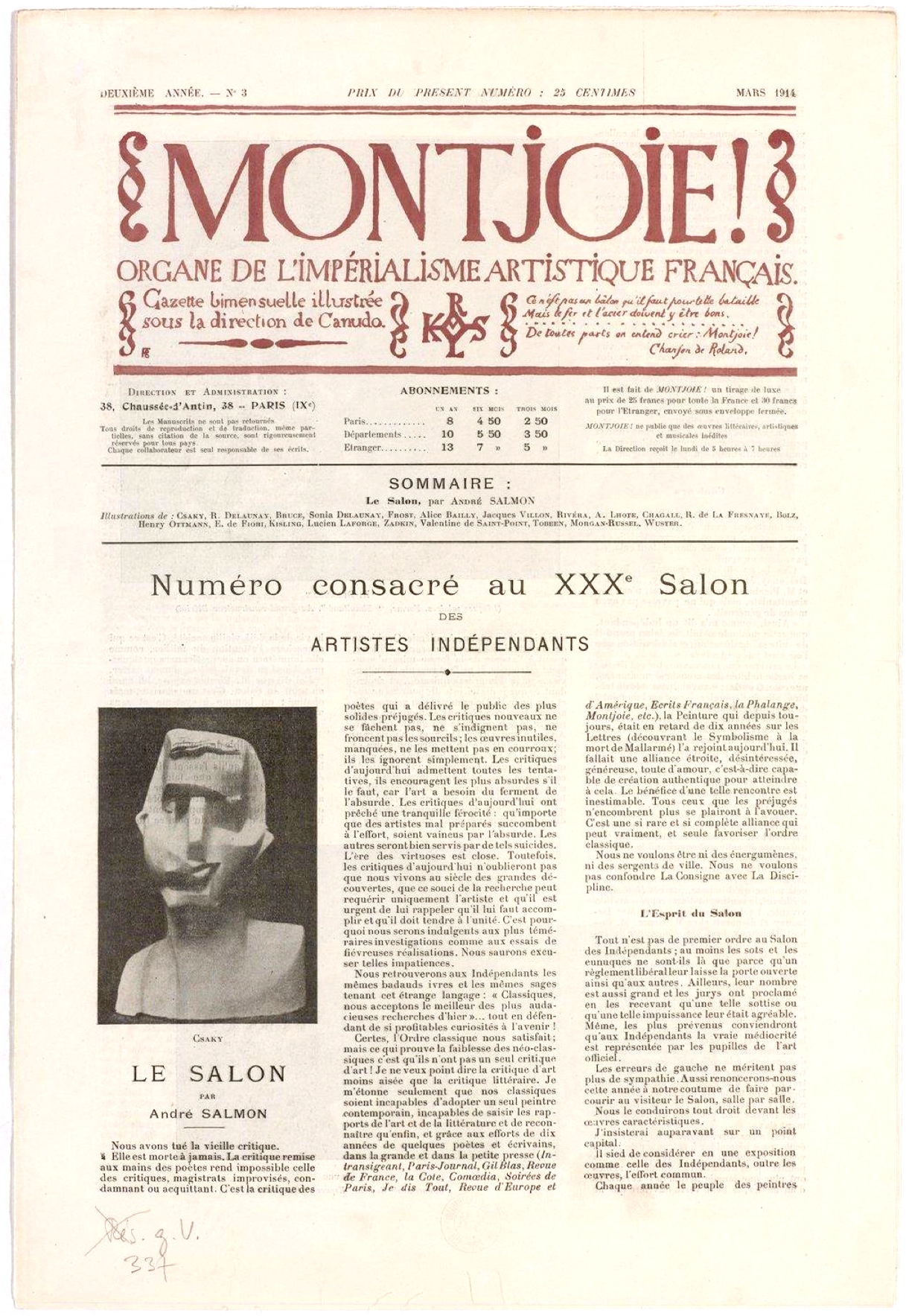
Montjoie!, Ricciotto Canudo, André Salmon, sculpture by Joseph Csaky, 3rd issue, 18 March 1914

=== Montjoie! ===
Between 1913 and 1914, he published a bimonthly avant-garde magazine entitled Montjoie!, organe de l'impérialisme artistique Francais. Participating artists included Guillaume Apollinaire, Maurice Raynal, Albert Gleizes and Joseph Csaky. The magazine paid special attention to poetry, prose, articles on art, literature, music and history. The contributors included André Salmon, Abel Gance, Igor Stravinsky, Erik Satie, Fernand Léger, Guillaume Apollinaire, Blaise Cendrars, Alfredo Casella, Raoul Dufy, Stefan Zweig, Robert Delaunay, Max Jacob, and Emile Verhaeren.

The first issue was published on 10 February 1913. The second included an essay signed by Igor Stravinsky presenting his new ballet The Rite of Spring as a religious work of faith grounded in a pagan, pantheistic conception. A special issue in the second volume of Montjoie!, published on 18 March 1914, was devoted entirely to the 30th Salon des Indépendants. The article written by André Salmon included photographs of works by Joseph Csaky, Robert Delaunay, Marc Chagall, Alice Bailly, Jacques Villon, Sonia Delaunay, André Lhote, Roger de La Fresnaye, Moise Kisling, Ossip Zadkine, Lucien Laforge and Valentine de Saint-Point. Publication of the magazine stopped in June 1914, on the eve of the First World War.

In 1920, he established an avant-garde magazine Le Gazette de sept arts, and a film club, CASA (Club des amis du septième art), in 1921. His best-known essay "Reflections on the Seventh Art" ("Réflexions sur le septième art") was published in 1923 after a number of earlier drafts, all published in Italy or France.

== Other writings ==
- La ville sans chef, Paris 1910
- Music as a religion of the future, London 1913
- L'usine aux images, Paris 1926. (A collection of his essays)
