= Henri Le Fauconnier =

French painter (1881–1946)

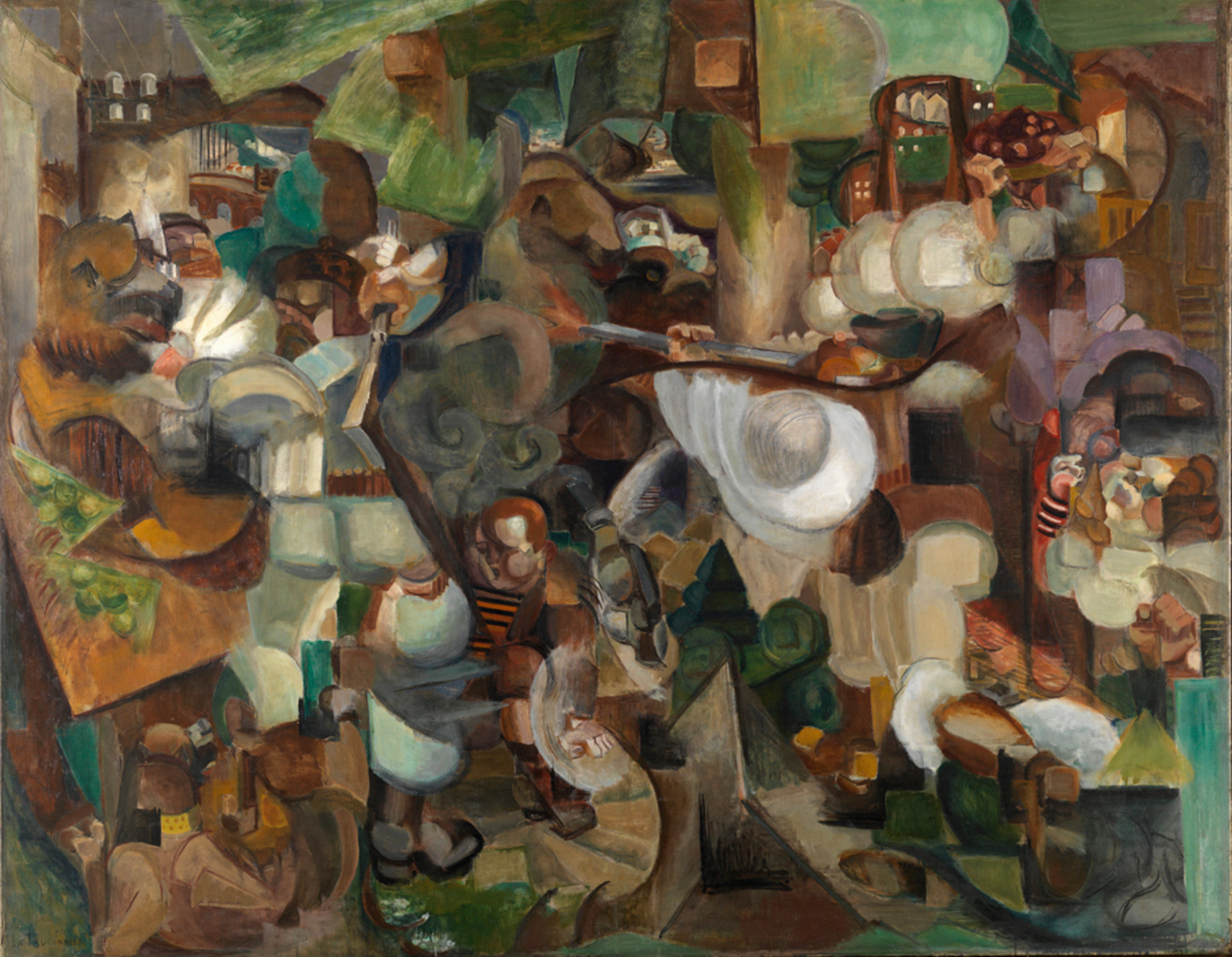
- Les Montagnards attaqués par des ours (Mountaineers Attacked by Bears) 1912, oil on canvas, 241 x 307 cm, Rhode Island School of Design Museum. Exhibited at the 1912 Salon d'Automne
- Born: Henri Victor Gabriel Le Fauconnier; 5 July 1881; Hesdin, France
- Died: 25 December 1946 (aged 65); Paris, France
- Education: Academie Julian
- Known for: Painting
- Movement: Cubism

Henri Victor Gabriel Le Fauconnier (French: [fɔkɔnje]; July 5, 1881 – December 25, 1946) was a French Cubist painter born in Hesdin. Le Fauconnier was seen as one of the leading figures among the Montparnasse Cubists. At the 1911 Salon des Indépendants Le Fauconnier and colleagues Jean Metzinger, Albert Gleizes, Fernand Léger and Robert Delaunay caused a scandal with their Cubist paintings. He was in contacts with many European avant-garde artists such as Wassily Kandinsky, writing a theoretical text for the catalogue of the Neue Künstlervereinigung in Munich, of which he became a member. His paintings were exhibited in Moscow reproduced as examples of the latest art in Der Blaue Reiter Almanach (The Blue Rider Almanac).

== Career ==
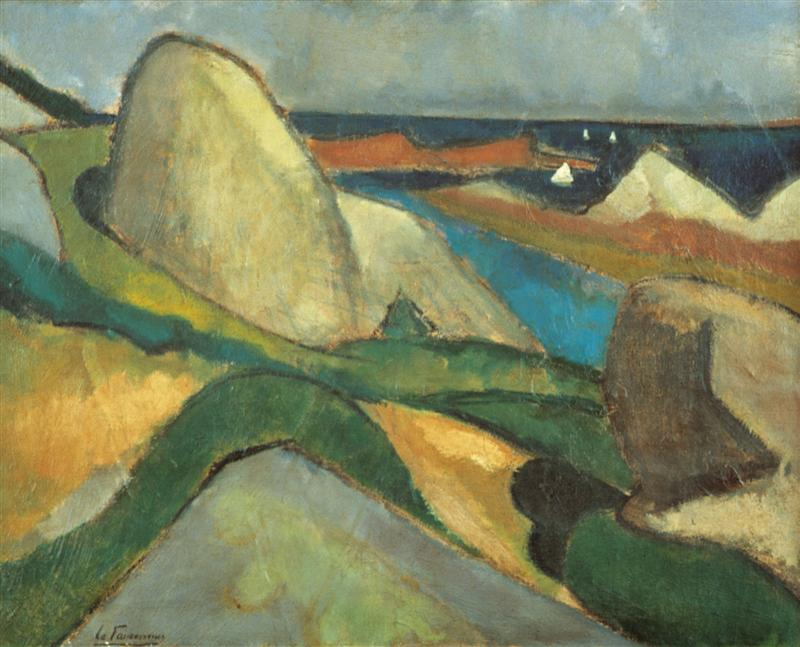
Ploumanac’h, 1908, Bergen, Museum Kranenburgh

In 1901 Henri Le Fauconnier moved from northern France to Paris, where he studied law, then attended painting classes in the studio of Jean-Paul Laurens, then in the Academie Julian. He changed his name from Fauconnier to Le Fauconnier and exhibited at the Salon des Indépendants in 1904 and 1905, implementing bold colors in line with Henri Matisse. He moved to Brittany in 1907 and painted the rocky landscapes of Ploumanac'h in a proto-Cubist style characterized by chastened tones of brown and greens with thick outlines delimiting the simplified forms.

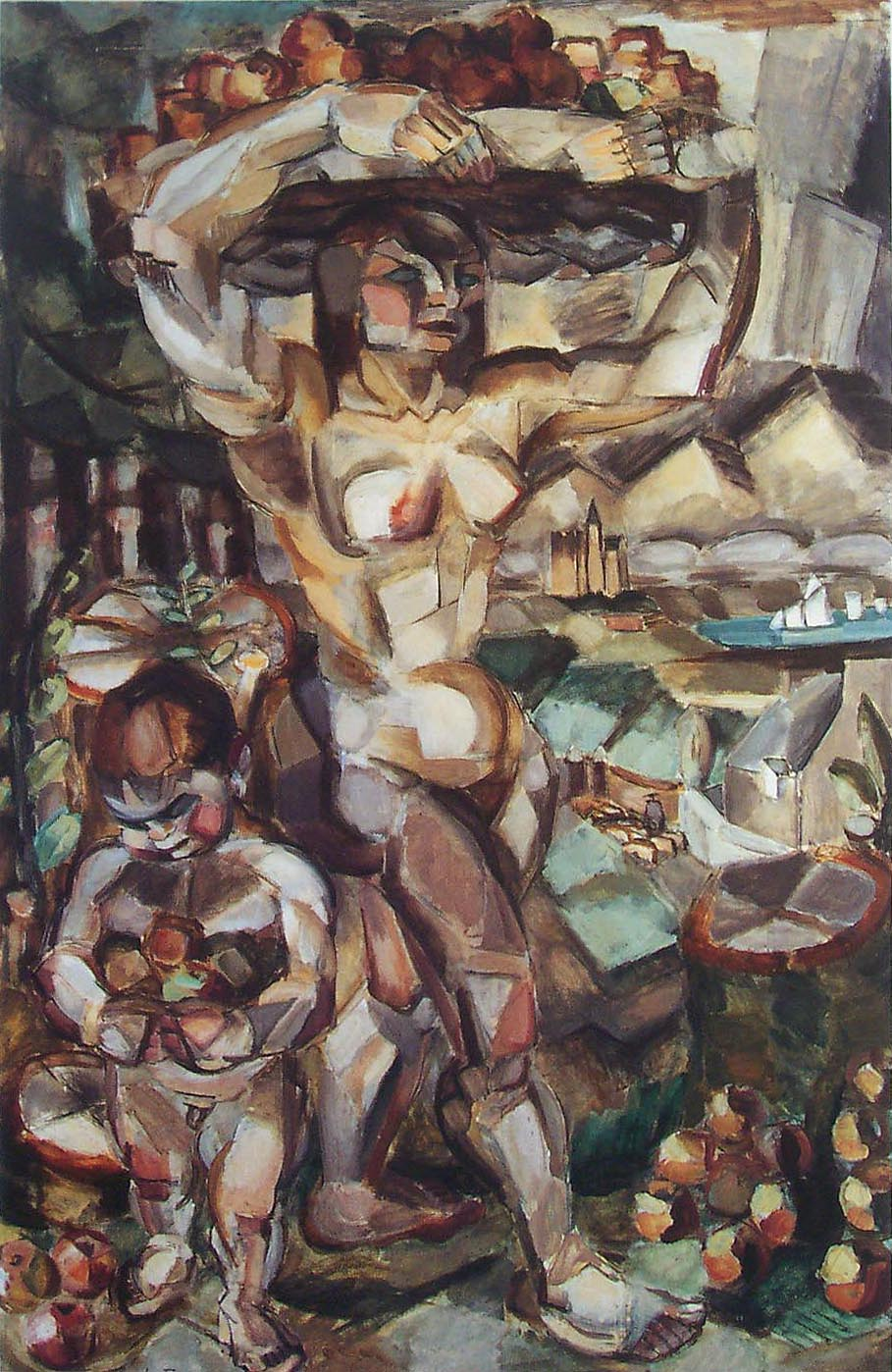
L'Abondance (Abundance), 1910–11, oil on canvas, 191 x 123 cm (75.25 x 48.5 in.), Gemeentemuseum Den Haag

He explored a personal style and put it into practice; painting nudes or portraits (such as that of the poet Pierre Jean Jouve in 1909 (Musée National d'Art Moderne). Under the influence of Paul Cézanne he developed his own form of Cubism. Back in Paris, he mingles with the artistic and literary gathered around Paul Fort at the Closerie des Lilas in Montparnasse.

At the 1909 Salon d’Automne Le Fauconnier exhibited alongside Constantin Brâncuși, Jean Metzinger and Fernand Léger.

Louis Vauxcelles, in his review of the 1910 Salon des Indépendants, made a passing and inaccurate reference to Le Fauconnier, Jean Metzinger, Albert Gleizes, Robert Delaunay and Fernand Léger, as "ignorant geometers, reducing the human body, the site, to pallid cubes."

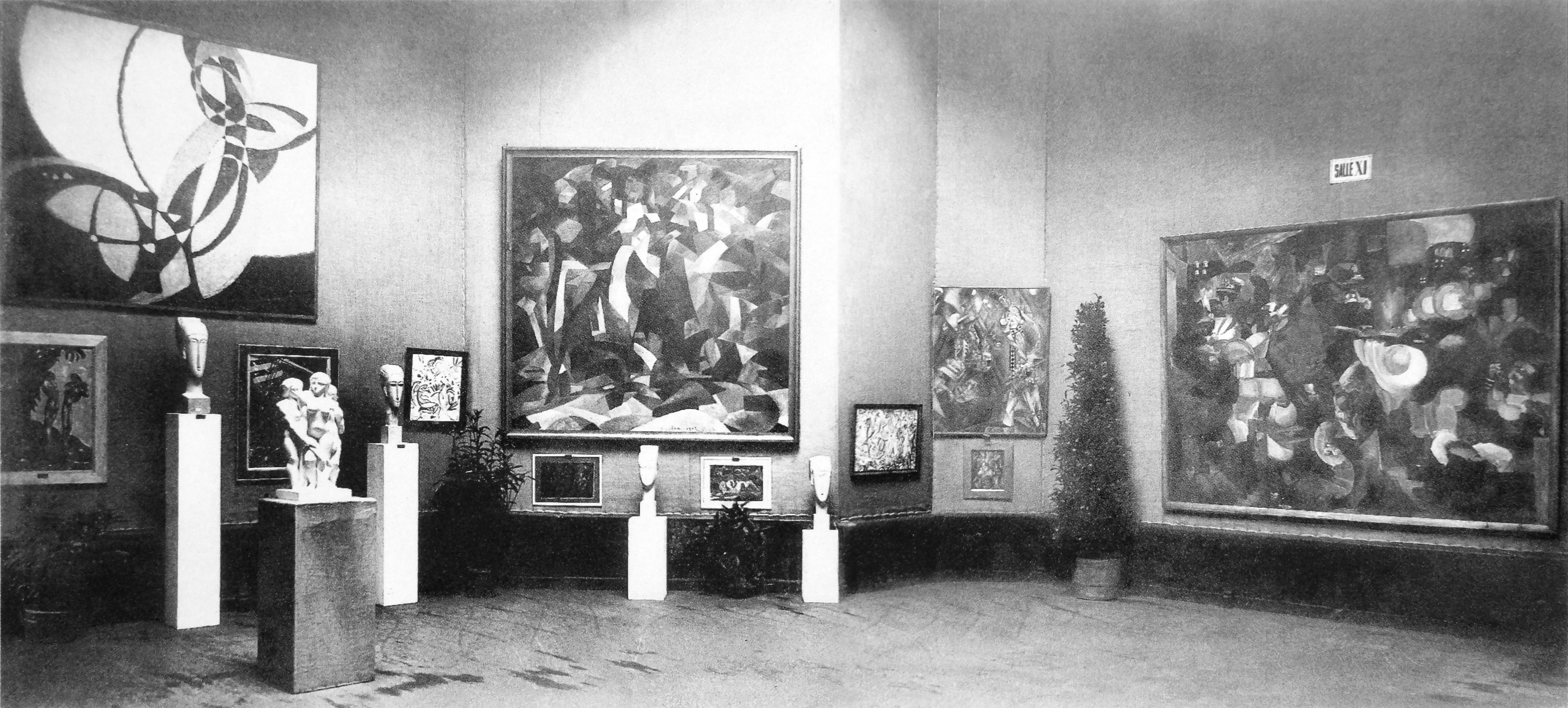
The Salon d'Automne of 1912, held in Paris at the Grand Palais from 1 October to 8 November. Le Fauconnier's monumental Mountaineers Attacked by Bears is exhibited on the right. Other works are shown by Jean Metzinger, Joseph Csaky, František Kupka, Francis Picabia, and Amedeo Modigliani

Paintings by Henri Le Fauconnier, 1910–11, L'Abondance, Haags Gemeentemuseum; Jean Metzinger, 1911, Le goûter (Tea Time), Philadelphia Museum of Art; Robert Delaunay, 1910–11, La Tour Eiffel. Published in La Veu de Catalunya, 1 February 1912

Metzinger had written in 1910 of 'mobile perspective' as an interpretation of what would soon become known as "Cubism" with respect to Picasso, Braque, Delaunay and Le Fauconnier.

At the invitation of Wassily Kandinsky, Le Fauconnier published a theoretical text in the catalog of the Neue Künstlervereinigung (Munich, 1910). He opened his Rue Visconti studio in Paris to artists eager like him to apply the lessons of Cézanne. With Jean Metzinger, Albert Gleizes, Fernand Léger, Robert Delaunay, he contributed to the Cubist scandal of the 1911 Salon des Indépendants. Le Fauconnier exhibited his vast Les Montagnards attaqués par des ours (Mountaineers Attacked by Bears) at the Salon d'Automne of 1912 (Paris).

February 1912 Henri Le Fauconnier was appointed to succeed Jacques-Émile Blanche as chef d'atelier of the avant-garde school of art Académie de La Palette. Le Fauconnier commissioned Jean Metzinger and André Dunoyer de Segonzac as full-time instructors for the morning sessions; Eugeniusz Żak (Eugène Zak) and Jean Francis Auburtin took over in the afternoon.

In 1912, Le Fauconnier participated in the first exhibition of Cubism in Spain, at Galeries Dalmau, Barcelona, with Jean Metzinger, Albert Gleizes, Marcel Duchamp, Juan Gris, Marie Laurencin, and August Agero.

Le Fauconnier was a contributing member of the Section d'Or (Puteaux Group).

At the outset of World War I Le Fauconnier moved to the Netherlands where he stayed for six years. His work at this time combined Cubism and Expressionism, which generated considerable success and influence in the Netherlands. He returned to France in 1920 where his paintings became more realistic.

He died of a heart attack in Paris (1946).

== Works ==
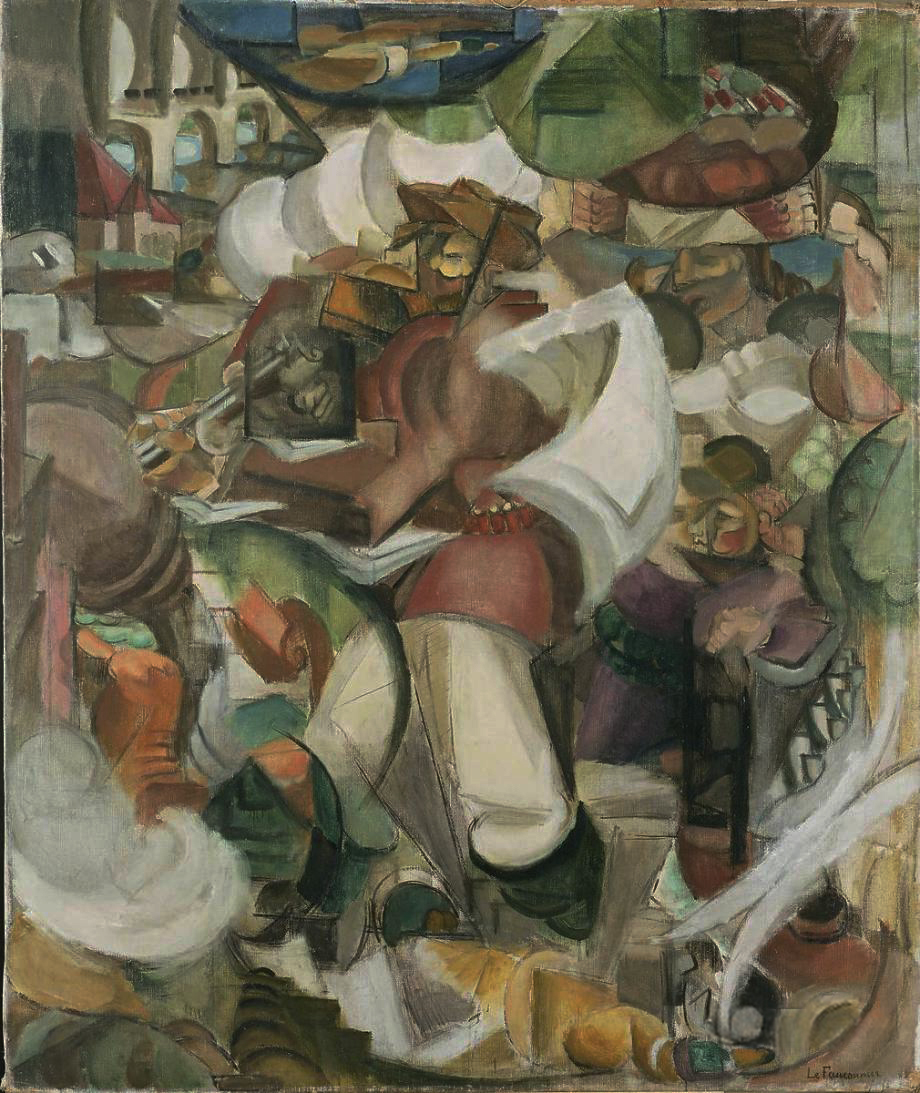
Henri Le Fauconnier, 1911–12, Le Chasseur (The Huntsman), oil on canvas, 203 x 166.5 cm, Gemeentemuseum Den Haag

- Femme nue dans un intérieur, Lyon, Musée des Beaux-Arts
- L’Église de Grosrouvre, Lyon, Musée des Beaux-Arts
- L’Enfant breton, Lyon, Musée des Beaux-Arts
- Nature morte aux fleurs, Beauvais, Musée Départemental de l’Oise
- Paysage, Lyon, Musée des Beaux-Arts
- Portrait de vieille femme, Lyon, Musée des Beaux-Arts
- Maisons dans les rochers à Ploumanac'h, Brest, Musée des Beaux-Arts
