= André Salmon =

French poet, art critic and writer

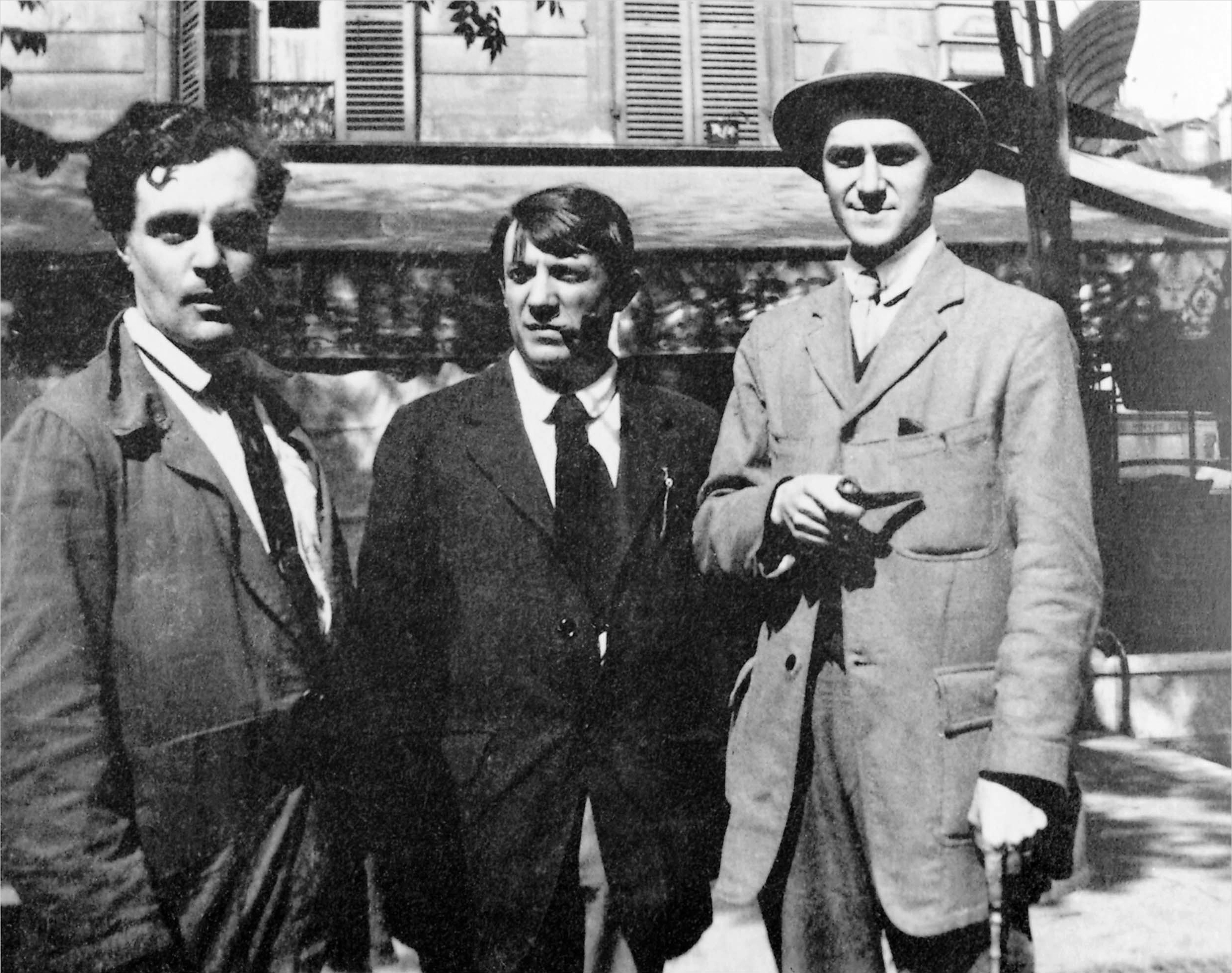
- André Salmon (right), Amedeo Modigliani (left), and Pablo Picasso (center) photographed by Jean Cocteau in 1916 in front of Café de la Rotonde
- Born: 4 October 1881; Paris, France
- Died: 12 March 1969 (aged 87); Sanary-sur-Mer, France
- Occupation: Journalist
- Known for: Poetry

André Salmon (4 October 1881, Paris – 12 March 1969, Sanary-sur-Mer) was a French poet, art critic and writer. He was one of the early defenders of Cubism, with Guillaume Apollinaire and Maurice Raynal.

== Biography ==
André Salmon was born in Paris, in the XI arrondissement, the fourth child of Émile-Frédéric Salmon, a sculptor and etcher, and Sophie-Julie Cattiaux, daughter of a founder of the Radical Socialist Party. Often assumed to come from a Jewish family, they were in fact secular Republicans, frequently in financial difficulty, and moved several times. André Salmon claimed in a letter to the editor of Le Crapouillot, now in a private collection, that his family descended from the Renaissance poet Jean Salmon Macrin, whose position in the court of Francis I may have indicated that his forebears were not Jewish. However, there were Jews in France at this time.

Salmon's education was neglected, although he received some tuition from the Parnassian poet Gaston de Raisme, a friend of François Coppée. From 1897 to 1902 he stayed in St-Petersburg, first with his parents and then as an assistant in the chancellery of the French consulate.

In 1902 Salmon returned to France for military service but was dismissed after a few months due to his weak physical condition. In the first decade of the 20th century, he mixed with literary circles of Paris' Latin Quarter. Then he met a young, then unknown poet Guillaume Apollinaire, and with a group of young artists, they formed an artistic group. In 1904 he moved into the Bateau-Lavoir and lived there with Picasso, Max Jacob, and Apollinaire. He lived a Bohemian life for several years until he fell in love with Jeanne Blazy-Escarpette. He found work as a journalist with L'Intransigeant and also contributed to Le Soleil. He married Jeanne on 13 July 1909 and settled with her on rue Rousselet in the 7th arrondissement of Paris.

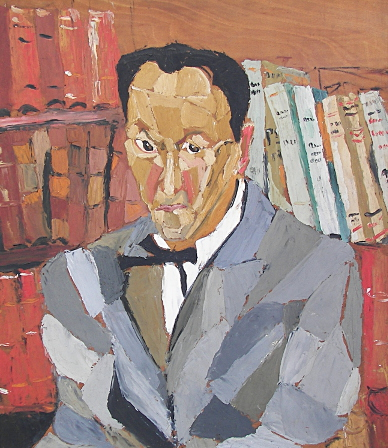
Portrait of Salmon by Josette Bournet, c.1947

During World War I (1914–18) Salmon enlisted in the army as a volunteer and served in the trenches. He was invalided in 1916 and returned to Paris where he became a factotum on the journal L'Éveil of Jacques Dhur. Salmon organized the exhibition L'Art Moderne en France from 16 to 31 July 1916 for the wealthy fashion designer Paul Poiret. Salmon gave "26 Avenue d'Antin" as the address and called the exhibition the "Salon d'Antin". Artists included Pablo Picasso, who showed Les Demoiselles d'Avignon for the first time, Amedeo Modigliani, Moïse Kisling, Manuel Ortíz de Zárate and Marie Vassilieff. Another of Poiret's exhibitions, also organized by Salmon, was La Collection particulière de M. Paul Poiret, from 26 April to 12 May 1923.

In the following years, Salmon continued to work as a journalist for works such as L'Europe nouvelle and La Paix sociale, while publishing poems, short stories, critiques, and essays. From 1928 Salmon worked for Le Petit Parisien as a court reporter. In the 1930s he ran into financial difficulties, while his wife became increasingly dependent on opium and he was forced publish in such lesser periodicals as Paris Sex-Appeal. Salmon was sent to Spain by the Petit Parisien to report on the Spanish Civil War (1936–39) from the Francoist side. His reports, deeply critical of the Fascists, were censored by the paper.

During World War II (1939–45) he was sent to Beirut as a war correspondent. After the fall of France, he made his way back via Marseille to Paris, where he found his wife struggling to survive. He rejoined Le Petit Parisien, but avoided any controversial subjects, and was forced to defend himself against attacks from the far-Right who accused him of being a Jew and a supporter of "degenerate art".

After the Liberation of France Salmon was sentenced to five years of "national indignity" for his work as a journalist in occupied France and had to publish under a pseudonym.

His wife died on 1 January 1949. On 29 October 1953, he remarried. In November 1961 he moved from Paris to Sanary, where he had built a small house in 1937. In 1964 Salmon was awarded the Grand Prix for poetry by the French Academy.

He died on 12 March 1969 at his home in Provence.

== Works ==
=== Poetry ===
- Poèmes, Vers et prose, 1905
- Féeries, Vers et prose, 1907
- Le Calumet, Falque, 1910
- Prikaz, Paris, Éditions de La Sirène, 1919
- C'est une belle fille! Chronique du vingtième siècle, Albin Michel, 1920
- Le Livre et la Bouteille, Camille Bloch éditeur, 1920
- L'Âge de l'Humanité, Paris, Gallimard, 1921
- Ventes d'Amour, Paris, À la Belle Édition, chez François Bernouard, 1922
- Peindre, Paris, Éditions de la Sirène, 1921
- Créances 1905–1910 (Les Clés ardentes. Féeries. Le Calumet). Paris, Gallimard, 1926
- Métamorphoses de la harpe et de la harpiste, Éditions des Cahiers Libres, 1926
- Vénus dans la balance, Éditions des Quatre Chemins, 1926
- Tout l'or du monde, Paris, Aux éditions du Sagittaire, chez Simon Kra, coll. Les Cahiers nouveaux, n. 36, 1927
- Carreaux 1918–1921 (Prikaz. Peindre. L'Âge de l'Humanité. Le Livre et la Bouteille), Paris, Gallimard, 1928
- Saints de glace, Paris, Gallimard, 1930
- Troubles en Chine, René Debresse éditeur, 1935
- Saint André, Paris, Gallimard, 1936
- Odeur de poésie, Marseille, Robert Laffont, 1944
- Les Étoiles dans l'encrier, Paris, Gallimard, 1952
- Vocalises, Paris, Pierre Seghers, 1957
- Créances, 1905–1910, followed by Carreaux 1918–1921, Paris, Gallimard, 1968
- Carreaux et autres poèmes, preface by Serge Fauchereau, Paris, Poésie/Gallimard, 1986

=== Books and short stories ===
- Tendres canailles, Paris, Librairie Ollendorff, 1913, and Paris, Gallimard, 1921
- Monstres choisis, Paris, Gallimard, 1918
- Mœurs de la Famille Poivre, Geneva, Éditions Kundig, 1919
- Le Manuscrit trouvé dans un chapeau, Société littéraire de France, 1919, and Paris, Stock, 1924
- La Négresse du Sacré-Cœur, Paris, Gallimard, 1920, 2009, inspired by Aïcha Goblet.
- Bob et Bobette en ménage, Paris, Albin Michel, 1920
- C'est une belle fille, Paris, Albin Michel, 1920
- L'Entrepreneur d'illuminations, Paris, Gallimard, 1921
- L'Amant des Amazones, Éditions de la Banderole, 1921
- Archives du Club des Onze, Nouvelle Revue Critique, 1924
- Une orgie à Saint-Pétersbourg, Paris, Aux éditions du Sagittaire, chez Simon Kra, La Revue européenne, n. 13, 1925
- Comme un homme, Eugène Figuière Éditeurs
- Noces exemplaires de Mie Saucée, Henri Paul Jonquières
- Le Monocle à deux coups, Paris, Jean-Jacques Pauvert, 1968

=== Critiques, essays, memoirs ===
- La Jeune Peinture française (including Histoire anecdotique du cubisme), Paris, Albert Messein, 1912, Collection des Trente
- Oluf Hartmann, Dix eaux-fortes, avec une notice biographique de Ernst Goldschmidt
- Histoires de Boches, with drawings by Guy Dollian. Paris, Société littéraire de France, 1917
- La Jeune Sculpture française, Paris, Albert Messein, 1919, Collection des Trente
- L'Art vivant, Paris, Georges Crès, 1920
- Propos d'atelier, Paris, Georges Crès, 1922
- La Révélation de Georges Seurat, Brussels, Éditions Sélection, 1921
- Cézanne, Paris, Stock, 1923
- André Derain, Paris, Gallimard, 1924
- Modigliani, Les Quatre chemins, 1926
- Kisling, Éditions des Chroniques du Jour, 1927
- Henri Rousseau, dit le Douanier, Paris, Georges Crès, 1927
- Émile Othon Friesz, Éditions des Chroniques du Jour, 1927
- Chagall, Éditions des Chroniques du Jour, 1928
- L'Art russe moderne, Éditions Laville, 1928
- Léopold-Lévy, Éditions du Triangle
- Ortíz de Zarate, Éditions du Triangle
- Picasso, Éditions du Triangle
- L'érotisme dans l'art contemporain, Éditions Calavas, 1931
- Le Drapeau noir, 1927
- Léopold Gottlieb, 1927
- Voyages au pays des voyantes, Paris, Éditions des Portiques
- Le Vagabond de Montparnasse: vie et mort du peintre A. Modigliani, 1939
- L'Air de la Butte. Souvenirs sans fin, Paris, Les Éditions de la Nouvelle France, 1945
- Paris tel qu'on l'aime, préface de Jean Cocteau, collectif, 1949
- Souvenirs sans fin, 3 volumes:
  - Première époque (1903–1908), Paris, Gallimard, 1955
  - Deuxième époque (1908–1920), Paris, Gallimard, 1956
  - Troisième époque (1920–1940), Paris, Gallimard, 1961
- Le Fauvisme, Paris, Éditions Aimery Somogy-Gründ, 1956
- La Vie passionnée de Modigliani, 1957
- La Terreur noire, Paris, Jean-Jacques Pauvert, 1959. L'Échappée, 2008
- Claude Venard, 1962
- Henri Rousseau, 1962
- Baboulène, 1964
- Modigliani le roman de Montparnasse, 1968
- À propos de Marc Chagall, 2003

=== Theatre ===
- Natchalo (with René Saunier), mise en scène Henri Burguet, 7 April 1922, Théâtre des Arts
- Deux hommes, une femme (with R. Saunier)
- Sang d'Espagne (with R. Saunier)

== Sources ==
- Gojard, Jacqueline, "Biobibliographie d'André Salmon", Andre Salmon Official Website, les amis d'André Salmon
- "Gallery Barbazanges", kubisme.info (in Dutch)
- Klüver, Billy; Cocteau, Jean (1999), A Day with Picasso, MIT Press, ISBN 978-0-262-61147-3
- Woods, Michael (2014), Reality vs. Perceptions: The Treatment of Early Modern French Jews in Politics and Literary Culture, VCU Press
