= Woman with a Fan (Metzinger, 1912) =

Painting by Jean Metzinger

- Femme à l'Éventail (French)
- Artist: Jean Metzinger
- Year: 1912
- Medium: Oil on canvas
- Dimensions: 90.7 cm × 64.2 cm (35.75 in × 25.25 in)
- Location: Solomon R. Guggenheim Museum; New York

Woman with a Fan (French: Femme à l'Éventail, also known as The Lady) is an oil painting created in 1912 by the French artist and theorist Jean Metzinger (1883–1956). The painting was exhibited at the Salon d'Automne, 1912, Paris (hung in the decorative arts section inside the Salon Bourgeois of La Maison Cubiste, the Cubist House). A 1912 photograph of Femme à l'Éventail hanging on a wall inside the Salon Bourgeois was published in The Sun (New York, N.Y.), 10 November 1912. The same photograph was reproduced in The Literary Digest, 30 November 1912.

Metzinger's Cubist contribution to the 1912 Salon d'Automne created a controversy in the Municipal Council of Paris, leading to a debate in the Chambre des Députés about the use of public funds to provide the venue for such 'barbaric' art. The Cubists were defended by the Socialist politician, Marcel Sembat. This painting was realized as Jean Metzinger and Albert Gleizes, in preparation for the Salon de la Section d'Or, published a major defence of Cubism, resulting in the first theoretical essay on the new movement, Du "Cubisme".

A photograph of Femme à l'Éventail appears among the Léonce Rosenberg archives in Paris, but there is no indication of when he acquired the painting. A Rosenberg label on the reverse bears the information "No.25112 J.Metzinger, 1913." By 1918 Rosenberg was buying Metzinger's paintings and may have acquired the picture around this time or soon afterwards.

In 1937 Femme à l'Éventail was exhibited at Musée du Petit Palais, Les Maitres de l'art indépendant, 1895-1937, no. 12 (dated 1912). Mlle. Gamier des Garets probably acquired the painting after the 1937 exhibition. By 1938 Solomon R. Guggenheim Museum had purchased the painting. It was gifted to the museum (gift 38.531) by Guggenheim in 1938 (the year after the formation of the foundation). Metzinger's Femme à l'Éventail forms part of the Founding Collection of the Solomon R. Guggenheim Museum, New York.

Femme à l'Éventail was showcased in an exhibition entitled The Great Upheaval: Masterpieces from the Guggenheim Collection, 1910–1918, from 30 November 2013 to 1 June 2014.

== Description ==
Femme à l'Éventail is an oil painting on canvas with dimensions 90.7 cm × 64.2 cm (35.7 in × 25.3 in). As the title indicates, the painting represents a woman holding a fan. She is shown in half-length sitting on what appears to be a green bench. She is wearing an elaborate gown with a Polka dot pattern consisting of an array of blue-filled circles, and holds in her right hand a folded fan. The left hand of the woman holds a paper that bears the artist's signature (lower left). She wears a hat with feathers or plumes of fashionable dressed Parisian women. She is placed in an outdoor setting with buildings, windows and green shutters in the 'background'. The work is similar stylistically with another work exhibited at the same Salon d'Automne, Dancer in a café (Albright-Knox Art Gallery, Buffalo New York).

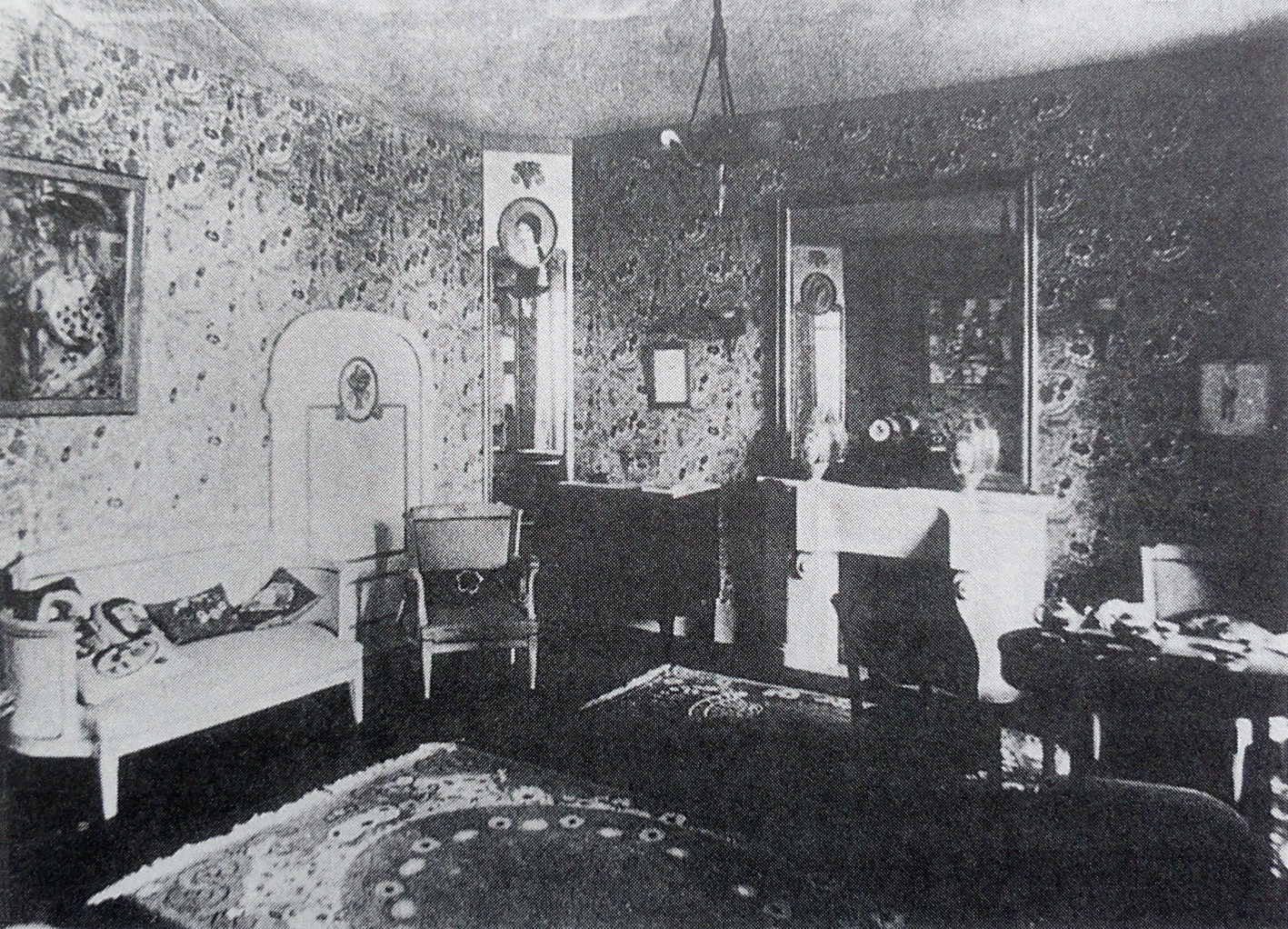
Le Salon Bourgeois, designed by André Mare inside La Maison Cubiste, in the decorative arts section of the Salon d'Automne, 1912, Paris. Metzinger's Femme à l'Éventail is hanging on the wall to the left; reflected in the mirror, Fernand Léger's Le passage à niveau (The Level Crossing), 1912. Towards the center-left is a portrait of a woman by Marie Laurencin

As in other works by Metzinger of the same period, there are elements to be found of the real world, e.g., a fan, windows, and feathers. The rest of the canvas consists of a series of geometric forms of greater or lesser abstraction, of convex and concave gradations that stem from the teachings of Georges Seurat and Paul Cézanne. The Divisionist brushwork, mosaic-like 'cubes', present in Metzinger's Neo-Impressionist phase (circa 1903 through 1907) have returned giving texture and rhythm to vast areas of the canvas, visible both in the figures and background.

Femme à l'Éventail portrays a strikingly fashionable woman at the height of Parisian fashion in 1912. The artist depicts the figure and background as a series of subdivided facets and planes, presenting multiple aspects of the scene simultaneously. This can be seen in the deliberate positioning of light, shadow, the nonconventional use of chiaroscuro, of form and color, and the way in which Metzinger assimilates the fusion of the background with the figures. The manifold surface has a complex geometry of reticulations with intricate series of (almost mathematical looking) black lines that appear in sections as underdrawing and in others as overdrawing.

"The style of the clothes is meticulously up-to-the-minute" writes Cottington of Metzinger's three entries at the 1912 Salon d'Automne, "the cut of the dresses, and the relatively uncorseted silhouettes they permitted their weavers to display, owe much more to Poiret than to Worth—indeed the check of one figure in the Dancer and the polka dots of the Woman with a Fan anticipate the post-war geometries, if not the colour harmonies, of Sonia Delaunay's fabrics, while the open-collared sportiness of the dress and cloche-style hat in The Yellow Feather look forward to the 1920s."

== Multiple perspective ==
Jean Metzinger, 1912, Danseuse au café (Dancer in a café), oil on canvas, 146.1 x 114.3 cm, Albright-Knox Art Gallery, Buffalo, New York. Published in Au Salon d'Automne "Les Indépendants" 1912, Exhibited at the 1912 Salon d'Automne

The reflexive function of complex geometry, juxtaposed multiple perspectives, planar fragmentation suggesting motion and rhythmic play with various symmetry types. Though very subtle, there does manifest itself in Femme à l'Éventail a spatial depth or perspective reminiscent of the optical illusion of space of the Renaissance; in the way, for example, windows appear of varying dimension depending on distance from the observer. This shows that non-Euclidean geometry does not imply the destruction of classical perspective, or that the breakdown of classical perspective need not be complete. Unlike the flattening of space associated with the Cubist paintings of Picasso and Braque of the same period, Metzinger had no intention of abolishing depth of field. Of course here perspectival space is only alluded to by changes of scale, not by co-ordinated linear convergence, resulting in a complex space perfectly adapted to a stage-set. This feature is observed not only in Metzinger's Cubist paintings, but also in his Divisionist and proto-Cubist works between 1905 and 1909, as well as in his more figurative works of the 1920s (during the Return to order phase).

The painting, as Metzinger's enchanting Dancer in a café, inscribes an ambivalence in that it expresses both contemporary and classical, modern and traditional, avant-garde and academic connotations, simultaneously. The "busy geometry of planar fragmentation and juxtaposed perspectives has a more than reflexive function," notes Cottington, "for the symmetrical patterning of its reticulations (as in the dancer's décolletage) and their rhythmic parallel repetitions suggest not only movement and diagrams but also, metonymically, the mechanised object-world of modernity."

"The works of Jean Metzinger" Guillaume Apollinaire writes in 1912 "have purity. His meditations take on beautiful forms whose harmony tends to approach sublimity. The new structures he is composing are stripped of everything that was known before him."

Apollinaire, possibly with the work of Eadweard Muybridge in mind, wrote a year later of this state of motion present in the Cubist paintings of Metzinger and others, as akin to cinematic movement around an object, revealing a plastic truth compatible with reality by showing the spectator "all its facets."

Albert Gleizes in 1911 remarks Metzinger is "haunted by the desire to inscribe a total image":

He will put down the greatest number of possible planes: to purely objective truth he wishes to add a new truth, born from what his intelligence permits him to know. Thus—and he said himself: to space he will join time. [...] he wishes to develop the visual field by multiplying it, to inscribe them all in the space of the same canvas: it is then that the cube will play a role, for Metzinger will utilize this means to reestablish the equilibrium that these audacious inscriptions will have momentarily broken. (Gleizes)

Now liberated from the one-to-one relationship between a fixed coordinate in space captured at a single moment in time assumed by classical vanishing-point perspective, the artist became free to explore notions of simultaneity, whereby several positions in space captured at successive time intervals could be depicted within the bounds of a single painting.

This picture plane, write Metzinger and Gleizes (in Du "Cubisme", 1912), "reflects the viewer's personality back upon his understanding, pictorial space may be defined as a sensible passage between two subjective spaces." The forms situated within this space, they continue, "spring from a dynamism which we profess to command. In order that our intelligence may possess it, let us first exercise our sensibility."

There are two methods of regarding the division of the canvas, according to Metzinger and Gleizes, (1) "all the parts are connected by a rhythmic convention", giving the painting a centre from which the gradations of colour proceed (or towards which they tend), creating spaces of maximum or minimum intensity. (2) "The spectator, himself free to establish unity, may apprehend all the elements in the order assigned to them by creative intuition, the properties of each portion must be left independent, and the plastic continuum must be broken into a thousand surprises of light and shade."

"There is nothing real outside ourselves; there is nothing real except the coincidence of a sensation and an individual mental direction. Far be it from us to throw any doubts upon the existence of the objects which strike our senses; but, rationally speaking, we can only have certitude with regard to the images which they produce in the mind." (Metzinger and Gleizes, 1912)

According to the founders of Cubist theory, objects possess no absolute or essential form. "There are as many images of an object as there are eyes which look at it; there are as many essential images of it as there are minds which comprehend it."

== Theoretical underpinnings ==
The idea of moving around an object in order to see it from different view-points is treated in Du "Cubisme" (1912). It was also a central idea of Jean Metzinger's Note sur la Peinture, 1910; Indeed, prior to Cubism painters worked from the limiting factor of a single view-point. And it was Metzinger for the first time in Note sur la peinture who enunciated the stimulating interest in representing objects as remembered from successive and subjective experiences within the context of both space and time. It was then that Metzinger discarded traditional perspective and granted himself the liberty of moving around objects. This is the concept of "mobile perspective" that would tend towards the representation of the "total image."

Though at first the idea would shock the general public some eventually came to accept it, as they came to accept the 'atomist' representation of the universe as a multitude of dots consisting of primary colors. Just as each color is modified by its relation to adjacent colors within the context of Neo-Impressionist color theory, so too the object is modified by the geometric forms adjacent to it within the context of Cubism. The concept of 'mobile perspective' is essentially an extension of a similar principle stated in Paul Signac's D'Eugène Delacroix au néo-impressionisme, with respect to color. Only now, the idea is extended to deal with questions of form within the context of both space and time.

== Salon d'Automne, 1912 ==
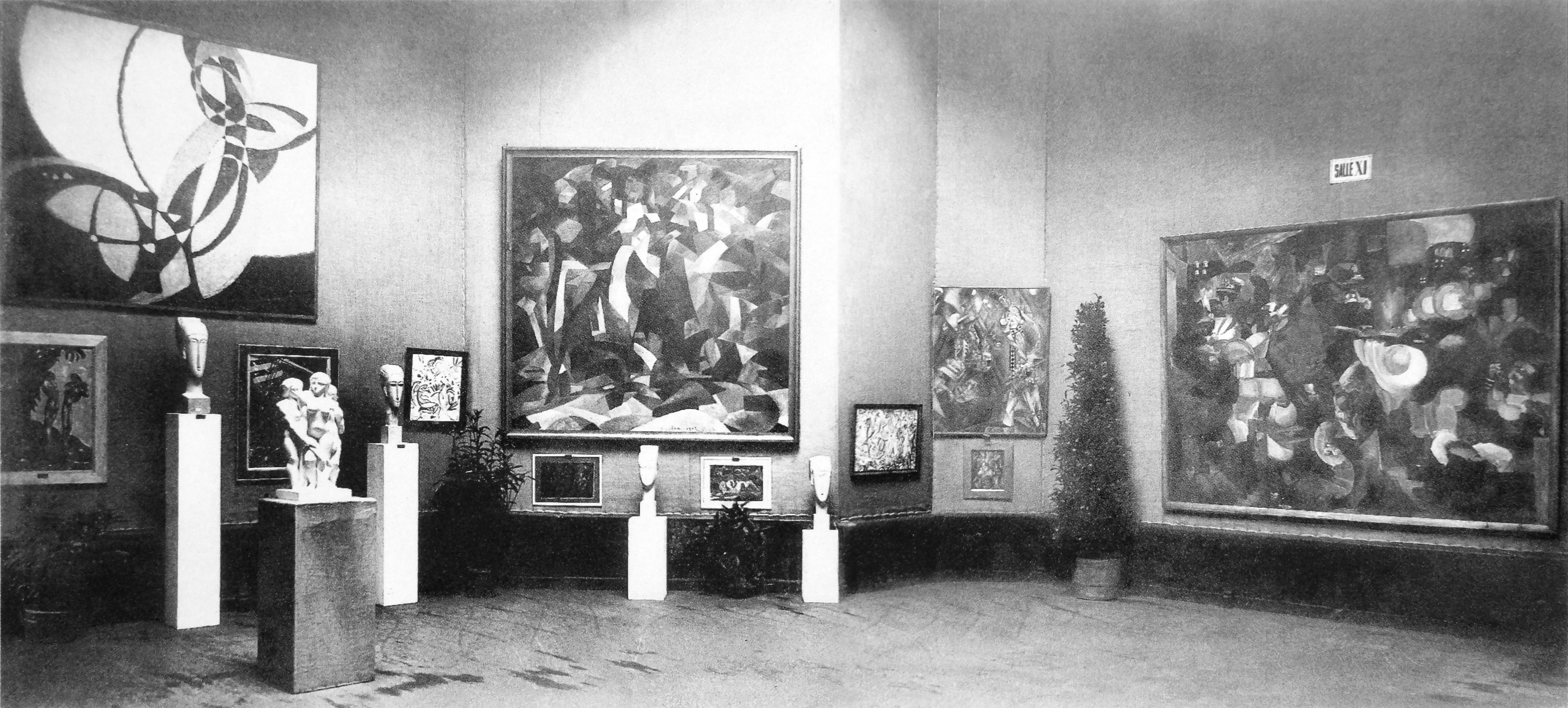
The Salon d'Automne of 1912, held in Paris at the Grand Palais from 1 October to 8 November. Metzinger's Danseuse is exhibited second to the right. Other works are shown by Joseph Csaky, František Kupka, Francis Picabia, Amedeo Modigliani and Henri Le Fauconnier.

The Salon d'Automne of 1912, held in Paris at the Grand Palais from 1 October to 8 November, saw the Cubists (listed below) regrouped into the same room XI.

The history of the Salon d'Automne is marked by two important dates: 1905, bore witness to the birth of Fauvism (with the participation of Metzinger), and 1912, the xenophobe and anti-modernist quarrel. The 1912 polemic leveled against both the French and non-French avant-garde artists originated in Salle XI where the Cubists exhibited their works. The resistance to foreigners (dubbed "apaches") and avant-garde artists was just the visible face of a more profound crises: that of defining modern French art, and the dwindling of an artistic system crystallized around the heritage of Impressionism centered in Paris. Burgeoning was a new avant-garde system, the international logic of which—mercantile and médiatique—put into question the modern ideology elaborated upon since the late 19th century. What had begun as a question of aesthetics quickly turned political, and as in the 1905 Salon d'Automne, with his infamous "Donatello chez les fauves", the critic Louis Vauxcelles (Les Arts, 1912) was most implicated in the deliberations. Recall too, it was Vauxcelles who, on the occasion of the 1910 Salon des Indépendants, wrote disparagingly of 'pallid cubes' with reference to the paintings of Metzinger, Gleizes, Le Fauconnier, Léger and Delaunay.

On 3 December 1912 the polemic reached the Chambre des députés (and was debated at the Assemblée Nationale in Paris).

- Jean Metzinger entered three works: Dancer in a café (entitled Danseuse), La Plume Jaune (The Yellow Feather), and Femme à l'Éventail (Woman with a Fan) which hung in the decorative arts section inside La Maison Cubiste (the Cubist House).
- Fernand Léger exhibited La Femme en Bleu (Woman in Blue), 1912 (Kunstmuseum, Basel) and Le passage à niveau (The Level Crossing), 1912 (Fondation Beyeler, Riehen, Switzerland)
- Roger de La Fresnaye, Les Baigneuse (The bathers) 1912 (The National Gallery, Washington) and Les joueurs de cartes (Card Players)
- Henri Le Fauconnier, The Huntsman (Haags Gemeentemuseum, The Hague, Netherlands) and Les Montagnards attaqués par des ours (Mountaineers Attacked by Bears) 1912 (Museum of Art, Rhode Island School of Design).
- Albert Gleizes, l'Homme au Balcon (Man on a Balcony), (Portrait of Dr. Théo Morinaud), 1912 (Philadelphia Museum of Art), also exhibited at the Armory Show, New York, Chicago, Boston, 1913.
- André Lhote, Le jugement de Paris, 1912 (Private collection)
- František Kupka, Amorpha, Fugue à deux couleurs (Fugue in Two Colors), 1912 (Narodni Galerie, Prague), and Amorpha Chromatique Chaude.
- Francis Picabia, 1912, La Source (The Spring) (Museum of Modern Art, New York)
- Alexander Archipenko, Family Life, 1912, sculpture
- Amedeo Modigliani, exhibited four elongated and highly stylized heads), sculptures
- Joseph Csaky exhibited the sculptures Groupe de femmes, 1911–1912 (location unknown), Portrait de M.S.H., no. 91 (location unknown), and Danseuse (Femme à l'éventail, Femme à la cruche), no. 405 (location unknown)

=== La Maison Cubiste ===
In the decorative arts section of the 1912 Salon d'Automne an architectural installation was exhibited that became known as Maison Cubiste (Cubist House), signed Raymond Duchamp-Villon and André Mare, along with a group of collaborators. La Maison Cubiste was a fully furnished house, or Projet d'Hôtel, with a staircase, wrought iron banisters, and a bedroom, and a living room—the Salon Bourgeois, where paintings by Marcel Duchamp, Gleizes, Laurencin, Léger and Metzinger's Woman with a Fan were hung. It was an example of L'art décoratif, a home within which Cubist art could be displayed in the comfort and style of modern, bourgeois life. Spectators at the Salon d'Automne passed through the full-scale 10-by-3-meter plaster model of the ground floor of the Façade architecturale, designed by Duchamp-Villon. "Mare's ensembles were accepted as frames for Cubist works because they allowed paintings and sculptures their independence", writes Christopher Green, "creating a play of contrasts, hence the involvement not only of Gleizes and Metzinger themselves, but of Marie Laurencin, the Duchamp brothers and Mare's old friends Léger and Roger La Fresnaye".

Reviewing the Salon d'Automne Roger Allard commended Metzinger's 'finesse and distinction of palette'. Maurice Raynal noted the seductive charm and sureness of execution of Metzinger's entries, the refined sensibility of Metzinger himself, the playfulness and grace of whom he compares to Pierre-Auguste Renoir, while singling out Metzinger as 'certainly ... the man of our time who knows best how to paint'.

== See also ==
- List of works by Jean Metzinger

== Literature ==
- La vie artistique. Le Salon d'Automne, les ensembles décoratifs, Roger Allard, La Cote, 14 October 1912
- The Sun (New York N.Y.), 10 Nov. 1912
- Exposition de cubistes français et d'un groupe d'artistes indépendants, Musée Rath, Geneva, 3–15 June 1913 (no. 22)
- Art of Tomorrow, 1939, p. 174 ("The Lady, 1915")
- La Peinture cubiste, Art d'aujourd'hui, L. Degand, ser. 4, May–June 1953, repr. p. 14
- The Solomon R. Guggenheim Museum: A Selection from the Museum Collection, 1954
- An Exhibition of Cubism: On the Occasion of the Fortieth Anniversary of the Arts Club of Chicago, October 3 to November 4, 1955
- An Exhibition of Paintings from the Solomon R. Guggenheim Museum, New York: At the Tate Gallery, London, 16 April–26 May 1957
- Solomon R. Guggenheim Museum Handbook, 1959, p. 118, repr.
- Fauves and Cubists, Umbro Apollonio, 1960
- Cubism 1907–1908: An Early Account, Edward F. Fry, Art Bulletin 48, March, 1966
- Painters of the Section D'Or: The Alternatives to Cubism, [Exhibition] September 27–October 22, 1967, Albright-Knox Art Gallery, Buffalo, New York, 1967
- Picasso and the Cubists, Fabbri, 1970, no. 65
- Cubism: A History and an Analysis, 1907–1914, John Golding, Faber & Faber, 1971
- Le cubisme: Actes du premier Colloque d'histoire de l'art contemporain tenu au Musée d'art et d'industrie, Saint-Étienne, les 19, 20, 21 novembre 1971, Centre de documentation et d'études d'histoire de l'art contemporain, Université de Saint-Etienne, 1973
- The Guggenheim Museum collection: paintings, 1880–1945, Solomon R. Guggenheim Museum, Angelica Zander Rudenstine, 1976
- André Mare and the 1912 Maison cubiste, Margaret Mary Malone, University of Texas at Austin, 1980
- Jean Metzinger in Retrospect, Joann Moser, Daniel Robbins, University of Iowa. Museum of Art, 1985
- Art de France, Nancy J. Troy, Modernism and the decorative arts in France: Art Nouveaux to Le Corbusier, New Haven, Yale University Press, 1991, 79–102
- The Maison Cubiste and the meaning of modernism in pre-1914 France, David Cottington, in Eve Blau and Nancy J. Troy, Architecture and Cubism, Montreal, Cambridge, MA, and London: MIT Press, 1998, 17–40
- Art in France, 1900–1940, Christopher Green, Yale University Press, 2003, p. 162

== Exhibitions ==
- Paris, Salon d'Automne, 1912
- Paris, Musée du Petit Palais, Les Maitres de l'art indépendant, 1895-1937, June – Oct. 1937, no. 12 (dated 1912)
- New York, Solomon R. Guggenheim Museum, 78 (checklist; dated 1912?); 79 (checklist; dated 1913; so dated in all subsequent Solomon R. Guggenheim Museum publications)
- Vancouver, Solomon R. Guggenheim Museum 88-T, no. 60, repr.
- Boston, Solomon R. Guggenheim Museum 90-T (no cat.)
- Montreal, Solomon R. Guggenheim Museum 93-T, no. 41
- New York, Solomon R. Guggenheim Museum 95 (checklist; withdrawn Sept. 12)
- The Arts Club of Chicago, An Exhibition of Cubism on the Occasion of the Fortieth Anniversary of the Arts Club of Chicago, Oct. 3 – Nov. 4, 1955, no. 43
- London, Solomon R. Guggenheim Museum 104-T, no. 5,0;
- Boston, Solomon R. Guggenheim Museum 119-T, no. 40; Lexington, KY., Solomon R. Guggenheim Museum 122-T, no. 20
- New York, Solomon R. Guggenheim Museum 144 (checklist)
- Worcester, Mass., Solomon R. Guggenheim Museum 148-T, no. 28
- The Museum of Fine Arts, Houston, The Heroic Years: Paris 1908–1914, Oct. 21 – Dec. 8, 1965 (no cat.)
- Buffalo, N.Y., Albright-Knox Art Gallery, Painters of the Section d'Or: The Alternatives to Cubism, Sept. 27 – Oct. 22, 1967, no. 37, repr. (dated 1913)
