= Dancer in a Café =

Painting by Jean Metzinger

- Danseuse au café (French)
- Artist: Jean Metzinger
- Year: 1912
- Medium: Oil on canvas
- Dimensions: 146.1 cm × 114.3 cm (57.5 in × 45 in)
- Location: Albright-Knox Art Gallery, Buffalo, New York

Dancer in a Café (also known as Danseuse au café or Au Café Concert and Danseuse) is an oil painting created in 1912 by the French artist and theorist Jean Metzinger. The work was created while Metzinger and Albert Gleizes, in preparation for the Salon de la Section d'Or, were publishing, Du "Cubisme", the first major defense of the Cubist movement, and it was first displayed (under the title Danseuse) at the 1912 Salon d'Automne in Paris. The work proved controversial within the Municipal Council of Paris, causing debate in the Chambre des Députés about the use of public funds to exhibit such 'barbaric' art, with the Cubists being defended by the Socialist deputy Marcel Sembat.

Dancer in a Café was first reproduced in a photograph published in an article entitled Au Salon d'Automne "Les Indépendants" in the French newspaper Excelsior, 2 Octobre 1912. The painting is now located at the Albright-Knox Art Gallery, Buffalo New York.

== Description ==
Danseuse au café is an oil painting on canvas with dimensions 146.1 × 114.3 cm (57.5 × 45 in). The painting represents a woman dancing in a café-concert. She is shown on the right half of the canvas wearing an elaborate gown and holding in her right hand a bouquet of flowers. In the café scene, four others, two women and two men, can be observed on the left of the painting, three of whom are seated in front of a table upon which various items are placed (including beverages), and one of whom is placed seemingly in the background (upper left).

Metzinger's "enchanting" Dancer in a Café, writes art historian Daniel Robbins, "exults in the exoticism of the moment, playing off the feathers or plumes of fashionable dressed Parisian women in their Worth gowns against an Amerindian pattern on the costume of the dancer, wittily comparing the height of European fashion with the anthropologically arcane."

As in other works by Metzinger of the same period, there are elements to be found of the real world, e.g., lighting fixtures, flowers, feathers and lace. The rest of the canvas consists of a series of crescendos and diminuendos of greater or lesser abstraction, of convex and concave forms, of hyperbolic and spherical surfaces, that stem from the teachings of Georges Seurat and Paul Cézanne. The Divisionist brushwork, mosaic-like 'cubes', present in his Neo-Impressionist phase (circa 1903 through 1907) have returned giving texture and rhythm to vast areas of the canvas, visible both in the figures and background.

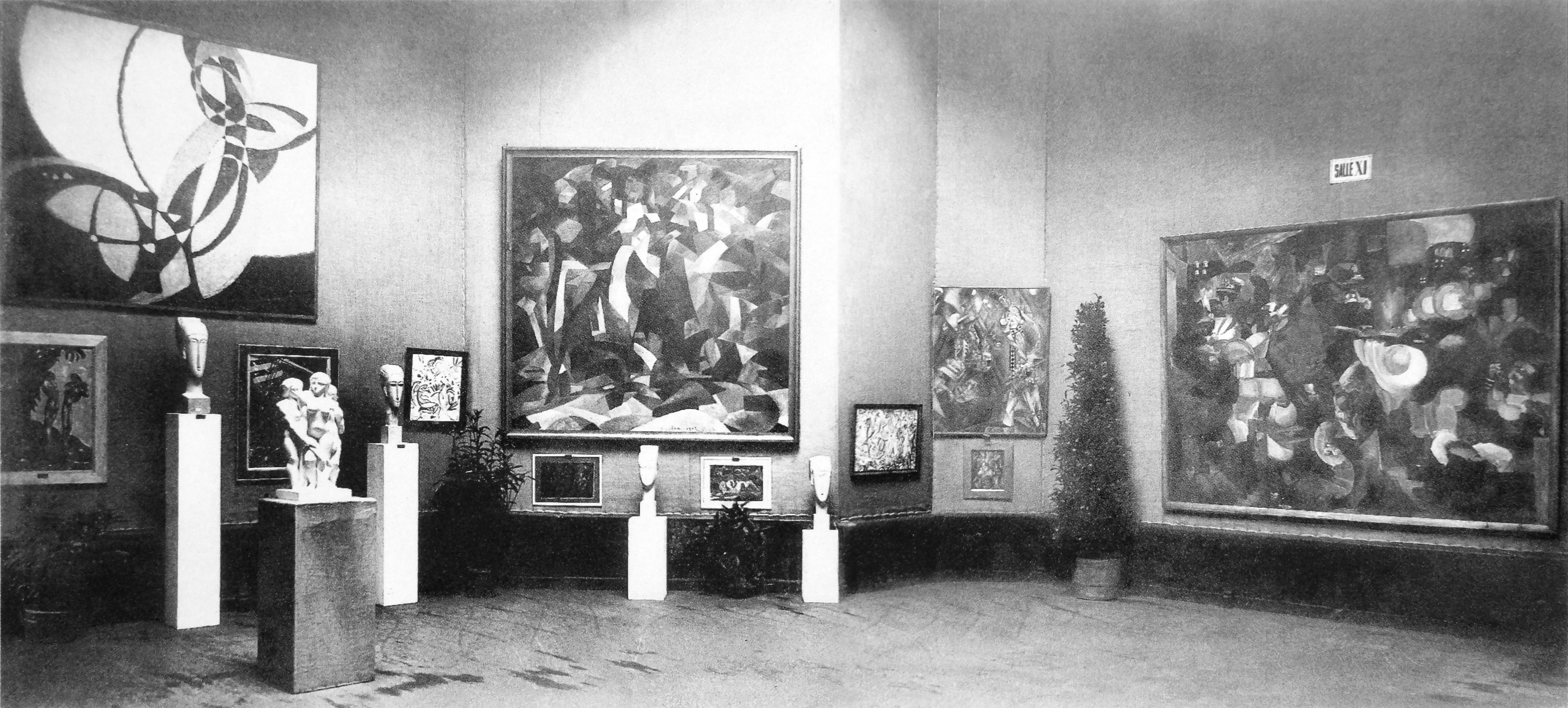
The Salon d'Automne of 1912, held in Paris at the Grand Palais from 1 October to 8 November. Metzinger's Danseuse is exhibited second to the right. Other works are shown by Joseph Csaky, František Kupka, Francis Picabia, Amedeo Modigliani and Henri Le Fauconnier.

Dancer in a café depicts strikingly fashionable women and men at the height of Parisian fashion in 1912. The dancer dressed in a directoire-style beaded and embroidered green silk velvet and chiffon caped evening gown embellished with celluloid sequins and gold trim, her hair coiffed in an elegant chignon, appears on a low stage or table performing for patrons or guests, all fashionably dressed and coiffed in silk and beaded net gowns, silver brocade and lace full-length gowns, ostrich-plumed hats, patterned suit, fedora and black tie. The artist depicts the figures and background as a series of subdivided facets and planes, presenting multiple aspects of the café scene simultaneously. This can be seen in the deliberate positioning of light, shadow, the nonconventional use of chiaroscuro, of form and color, and the way in which Metzinger assimilates the fusion of the background with the figures. The manifold surface has a complex geometry of reticulations with intricate series of (almost mathematical looking) black lines that appear in sections as underdrawing and in others as overdrawing.

"The style of the clothes is meticulously up-to-the-minute" writes Cottington of Metzinger's three entries at the 1912 Salon d'Automne, "the cut of the dresses, and the relatively uncorseted silhouettes they permitted their weavers to display, owe much more to Poiret than to Worth—indeed the check of one figure in the Dancer and the polka dots of the Woman with a Fan anticipate the post-war geometries, if not the colour harmonies, of Sonia Delaunay's fabrics, while the open-collared sportiness of the dress and cloche-style hat in The Yellow Feather look forward to the 1920s."

== Paul Poiret, Isadora Duncan and the art world ==
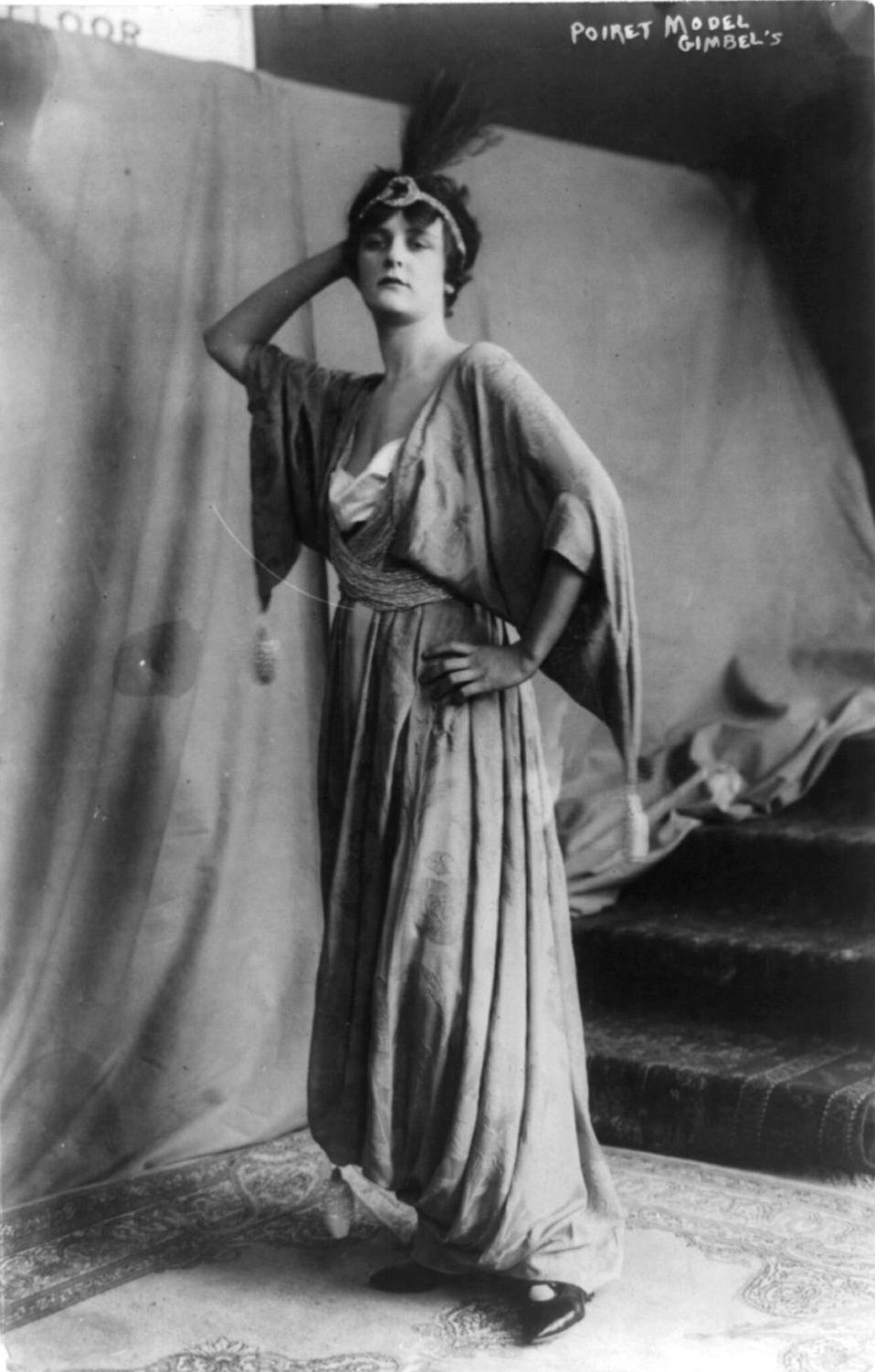
Dress designed by Paul Poiret, c. 1912, Poiret model – Gimbels

The French fashion designer Paul Poiret actually worked for the House of Worth early in the 20th century, however, the "brazen modernity of his designs" proved too much for Worth's conservative clientele. Poiret established his own house in 1903 and threw spectacular parties to promote his work.

In June 1911 Poiret unveiled "Parfums de Rosine" in a grand soirée held at his palatial home (a hôtel particulier avenue d'Antin), a costume ball christened "la mille et deuxième nuit", (the thousand and second night), attended by the Parisian high-society and the artistic world. Raoul Dufy—with whom Metzinger had exhibited at the gallery of Berthe Weill in 1903, the Indépendants of 1905 and Galerie Notre-Dame-des-Champs in 1908—designed the invitation. Gardens were illuminated by lanterns and live tropical birds. His marketing strategy became a sensation and the talk of Paris. A second scent debuted in 1912, "Le Minaret", again emphasizing the harem theme.

In 1911, the photographer Edward Steichen was challenged by publisher Lucien Vogel to promote fashion as a fine art by the use of photography. The photographs of Poiret's gowns, published in the April 1911 issue of the magazine Art et Décoration, are now considered to be the first modern fashion photography shoot. In 1912, Vogel began his renowned fashion journal La Gazette du Bon Ton, showcasing Poiret's designs, along with other leading Paris designers such as the House of Charles Worth, Louise Chéruit, Georges Doeuillet, Jeanne Paquin, Redfern & Sons and Jacques Doucet (the Post-Impressionist and Cubist art collector who purchased Les Demoiselles d'Avignon, directly from Picasso's studio).

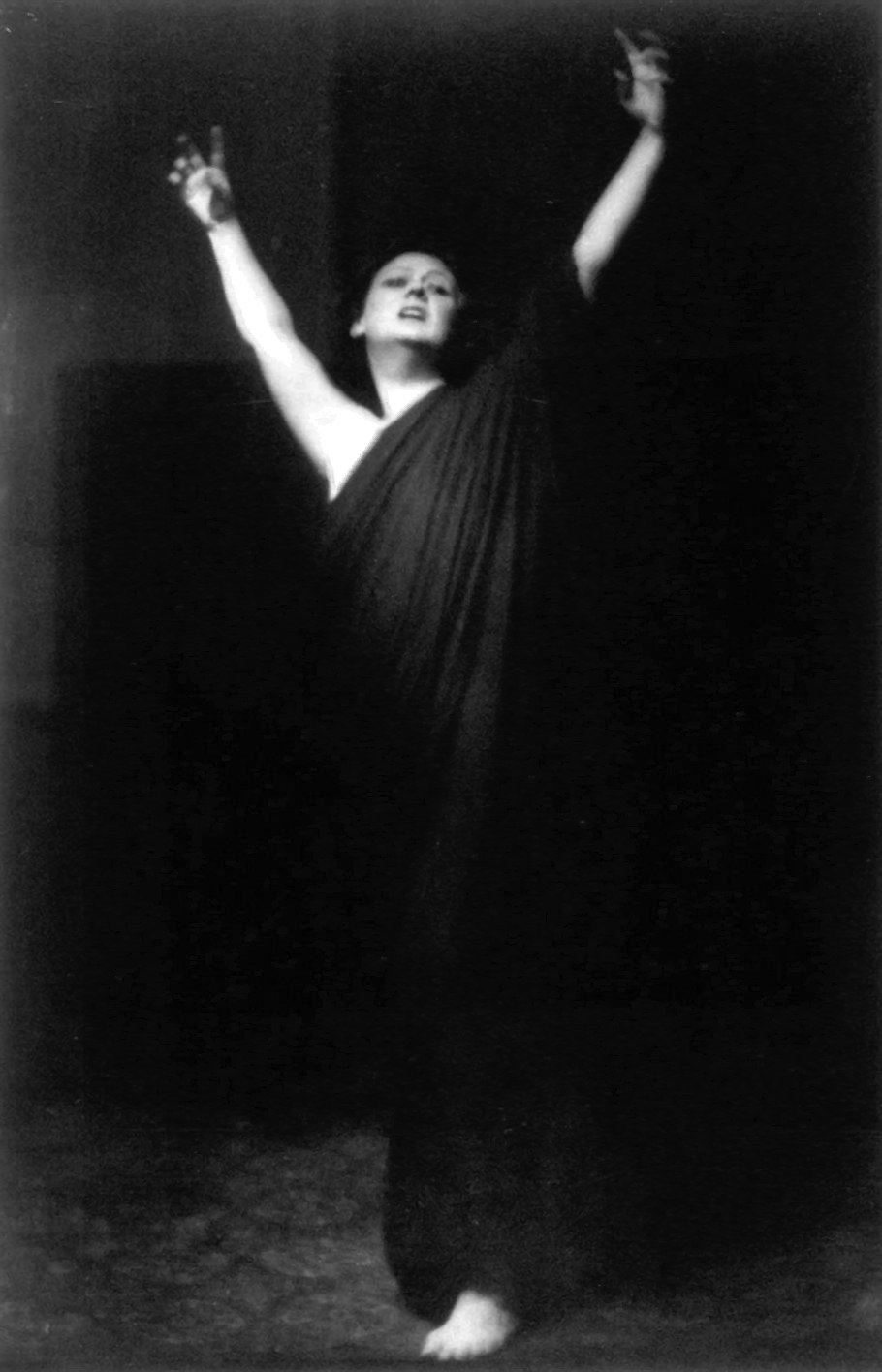
Isadora Duncan performing barefoot during her 1915–1918 American tour. Photo by Arnold Genthe

Paul Poiret had a lifelong interest in modern art for the purposes of self-promotion and the benefit of his diverse commercial enterprises. In 1911 he rented and restored a mansion built by the architect Ange-Jacques Gabriel for Louis XV, 1750, called Pavillon du Butard in La Celle-Saint-Cloud (not far from Albert Gleizes' studio and close to the Duchamp residence, where the Section d'Or group gathered) and threw lavish parties, including one of the more famous grandes fêtes dated 20 June 1912, La fête de Bacchus (re-creating the Bacchanalia hosted by Louis XIV at Versailles). Guy-Pierre Fauconnet (1882–1920) designed the invitation. Isadora Duncan, wearing a Hellenic evening gown designed by Poiret, danced on tables among 300 guests and 900 bottles of champagne were consumed until the first light of day.

Isadora Duncan, a girl from California said to have posed for Eadweard Muybridge, placed an emphasis on "evolutionary" dance motion, insisting that each movement was born from the one that preceded it, that each movement gave rise to the next, and so on in organic succession. Her dancing defined the force of progress, change, abstraction and liberation. In France too Duncan delighted her audience.

André Dunoyer de Segonzac, Max Jacob, André Salmon and others such as Kees van Dongen and Raoul Dufy are known to have attended Poiret's balls. Salmon writes about one of them in L'Air de la Butte: "Poiret who opens his home to artists of his choice, who prepare, in his gardens, a party in the spirit of 1889". Here Salmon makes reference to the Exposition Universelle (1889).

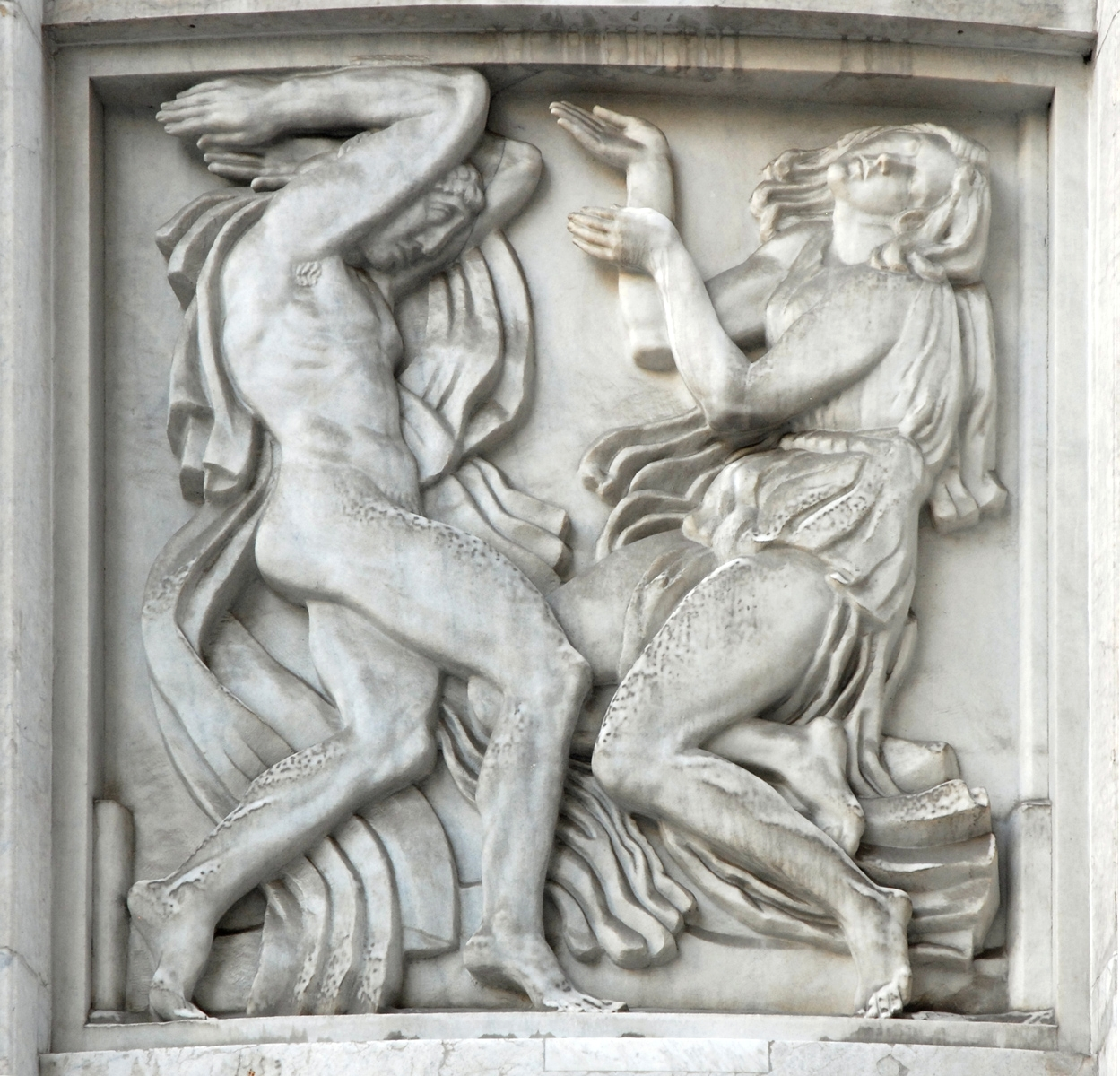
Antoine Bourdelle, 1912, Bas-relief (méthope), façade of the Théâtre des Champs Elysées. Representation of the dancer Isadora Duncan (on the right). In 1909 Bourdelle attended a show of Isadora Duncan at the Théâtre du Châtelet where she played Gluck's Iphigenia.

By 1912, Marie Laurencin had entered into an intimate lesbian relationship with the fashion designer Nicole Groult, born Nicole Poiret (the sister of Paul Poiret). In 1906 Nicole Poiret, with her brother Paul and friend Isadora Duncan fought a tense battle for the liberation of women, which began by the abolition of the corset. Laurencin had shown together with Metzinger and other Cubists in Room 41 of the 1911 Salon des Indépendants (at the suggestion of Guillaume Apollinaire), which provoked the 'scandal' out of which Cubism emerged and spread throughout Paris, France, Europe and so on. In the company of her friend Marie Laurencin, Nicole Poiret frequented the bohemian world of Montmartre, Le Bateau-Lavoir, and the Cubists.

The sculptor Emile-Antoine Bourdelle had met Isadora in 1903 at Auguste Rodin's picnic, and in 1909 he saw her dance on stage. Bourdelle had previously been asked to decorate the façade of the planned Théâtre des Champs-Élysées. When he saw her he realized that Isadora was his muse: "To me it seemed that there, through her, was animated an ineffable frieze wherein divine frescoes slowly became human realities. Each leap, each attitude of the great artist remains in my memory like flashes of lightning." Bourdelle would return from the theatre and sketch for hours. His images of Isadora are the most varied, for they convey not only Isadora but the vast range of emotions she embodied.

By 1912 Isadora had become an icon for artists in Paris. Many had first seen her in 1903 when she had gone to the Ecole des Beaux-Arts and distributed complimentary tickets to students. The artist Dunoyer de Segonzac published his first Isadora portfolio in 1910, with a preface in verse by the poet Fernand Divoire. At this time, Dunoyer de Segonzac and Metzinger were both teachers at the Académie de La Palette, 104 Bd de Clichy, Paris 18ème, along with Henri Le Fauconnier.

Metzinger's interest in fashion was mirrored by Poiret's interest in modern art. On 18 November 1925 works from the art collection of Paul Poiret were exhibited and sold at a public auction in Paris. Artists in his collection included Derain, van Dongen, Dufresne, Dufy, de La Fresnaye, Othon Friesz, Matisse, Modigliani (Portrait de Max Jacob), Picabia, Picasso, Rouault and Dunoyer de Segonzac.

Though it is unclear whether Metzinger attended these parties it would be very unlikely that he and a selected few of his fellow Cubists did not—considering the celebrity status he enjoyed at the forefront of the avant-garde. Three months after La fête de Bacchus Metzinger exhibited Dancer in a café at the Salon d'Automne, held in Paris at the Grand Palais from 1 October to 8 November 1912.

== Multiple perspective ==
Despite Metzinger's conceptualism of Cubist painting—the reflexive function of complex geometry, juxtaposed multiple perspectives, planar fragmentation suggesting motion and rhythmic play with various symmetry types—there does manifest itself in Danseuse a certain spatial depth or perspective reminiscent of the optical illusion of space of the Renaissance; in the way, for example, the wall-mounted lighting fixtures become smaller with distance, and so too the man at the upper left appearing smaller in the background than his counterparts in the foreground. It shows that non-Euclidean geometry does not imply the absolute destruction of classical perspective, or that simply, the breakdown of classical perspective need not be complete. Unlike the flattening of space associated with the Cubist paintings of others, Metzinger had no intention of abolishing depth of field. Of course here perspectival space is only alluded to by changes of scale, not by co-ordinated linear convergence, resulting in a complex space perfectly adapted to a stage-set. This feature is observed not only in Metzinger's Cubist paintings, but also in his Divisionist and proto-Cubist works between 1905 and 1909, as well as in his more figurative works of the 1920s (during the Return to order phase).

Jean Metzinger, 1913, En Canot (Im Boot), oil on canvas, 146 × 114 cm, exhibited at Moderni Umeni, S.V.U. Mánes in Prague, 1914, acquired in 1916 by Georg Muche at the Galerie Der Sturm, confiscated by the Nazis circa 1936, displayed at the Degenerate Art show in Munich, and missing ever since.

There are, however, objective factors that prevent the illusion from succeeding completely: (1) the canvas is two-dimensional while reality is three-dimensional, (2) the uniqueness of the view-point (humans have two eyes). Metzinger compensates for the missing spatiality in his two-dimensional representation by giving other cues for depth, in addition to relative size: shading and shadows, source of light, occlusion (e.g., the stage or table upon which the woman dances cuts 'in front' of the woman sitting at the table). Metzinger represents a subjective effect objectively on the canvas, imitating subjective phenomena (of vision) objectively. Henri Poincaré, in Science and Hypothesis, 1902, discusses 'representative' space (visual, tactile and motor space) versus 'geometrical' space.

The painting inscribes an ambivalence in that it expresses both contemporary and classical, modern and traditional, avant-garde and academic connotations, simultaneously. The "busy geometry of planar fragmentation and juxtaposed perspectives has a more than reflexive function," notes Cottington, "for the symmetrical patterning of its reticulations (as in the dancer's décolletage) and their rhythmic parallel repetitions suggest not only movement and diagrams but also, metonymically, the mechanised object-world of modernity."

Two works entitled Nu and Landscape, circa 1908 and 1909 respectively, indicate that Metzinger had already departed from his Fauvist brand of Divisionism by 1908. Turning his attention fully towards the geometric abstraction of form, Metzinger allowed the viewer to reconstruct the original volume mentally and to imagine the object depicted within space. But this wasn't the space of Euclidean geometry and its associated classical one-point perspective in use and unquestioned since the onset of the Renaissance. This was an all-out multi-frontal attack on the narrow limitations of academicism, on pre-20th century empiricism, on positivism, determinism and the untenable notions of absolute space, absolute time and absolute truth. It was a revolt inline with those leveled by the mathematician Henri Poincaré and the philosophers William James, Friedrich Nietzsche and Henri Bergson. This was an embrace of Riemannian geometry, of the relativity of knowledge, of realities hidden by human vision, an embrace of the world that surpassed material appearances. Poincaré, in Science & Method, The Relativity of Space (1897), wrote: "Absolute space exists no longer; there is only space relative to a certain initial position of the body."

Thus the characteristic property of space, that of having three dimensions, is only a property of our distribution board, a property residing, so to speak, in the human intelligence. The destruction of some of these connections that is to say of these associations of ideas, would be sufficient to give us a different distribution board, and that might be enough to endow space with a fourth dimension. ... It quite seems, indeed, that it would be possible to translate our physics into the language of geometry of four dimensions.

— Henri Poincaré, 1897

Albert Gleizes, writing on Metzinger's Cubism in September 1911 (almost a year before the completion of Danseuse au café), identified Metzinger as a follower of Nietzsche who 'invents his own truth' by destroying 'old values'.

His concerns for color that had assumed a primary role both as a decorative and expressive device before 1908 had given way to the primacy of form. But his monochromatic tonalities would last only until 1912, when both color and form would boldly combine to produce such works as Danseuse au café. "The works of Jean Metzinger" Guillaume Apollinaire writes in 1912 "have purity. His meditations take on beautiful forms whose harmony tends to approach sublimity. The new structures he is composing are stripped of everything that was known before him."

As a resident of la Butte Montmartre in Paris, Metzinger entered the circle of Picasso and Braque (in 1908). "It is to the credit of Jean Metzinger, at the time, to have been the first to recognize the commencement of the Cubist Movement as such" writes S. E. Johnson, "Metzinger's portrait of Apollinaire, the poet of the Cubist Movement, was executed in 1909 and, as Apollinaire himself has pointed out in his book The Cubist Painters (written in 1912 and published in 1913), Metzinger, following Picasso and Braque, was chronologically the third Cubist artist.

== Simultaneity and multiplicity ==
Eadweard Muybridge, 1887, Animal Locomotion, Plate 187 – woman dancing (fancy), no. 12

Eadweard Muybridge, 1887, Animal Locomotion, Woman Dancing (Miss Larrigan), animated using still photographs: one of the production experiments that led to the development of motion pictures.

With the overthrow of classical perspective and its implicit staticity quasi-complete, the new concept of mobile perspective, first propounded by Metzinger in his 1910 publication Note sur la peinture, implied explicitly the dynamism of motion within multiple-spatial dimensions. In the article Metzinger notes the similarities between Robert Delaunay, Henri Le Fauconnier, Georges Braque and Pablo Picasso, stressing the distance between their works and traditional perspective. These artists, with Metzinger flanked between, granted themselves 'the liberty of moving around objects', and combining many different views in one image, each recording varying experiences over the course of time.

Apollinaire, possibly with the work of Eadweard Muybridge in mind, wrote a year later of this "state of motion" as akin to "cinematic" movement around an object, revealing a "plastic truth" compatible with reality by showing the spectator "all its facets".

Gleizes again in 1911 remarks Metzinger is "haunted by the desire to inscribe a total image":

He will put down the greatest number of possible planes: to purely objective truth he wishes to add a new truth, born from what his intelligence permits him to know. Thus—and he said himself: to space he will join time. ... he wishes to develop the visual field by multiplying it, to inscribe them all in the space of the same canvas: it is then that the cube will play a role, for Metzinger will utilize this means to reestablish the equilibrium that these audacious inscriptions will have momentarily broken.

— Gleizes

Now liberated from the one-to-one relationship between a fixed coordinate in space captured at a single moment in time assumed by classical vanishing-point perspective, the artist became free to explore notions of simultaneity, whereby several positions in space captured at successive time intervals could be depicted within the bounds of a single painting.

This picture plane, write Metzinger and Gleizes (in Du "Cubisme", 1912), "reflects the viewer's personality back upon his understanding, pictorial space may be defined as a sensible passage between two subjective spaces." The forms situated within this space, they continue, "spring from a dynamism which we profess to command. In order that our intelligence may possess it, let us first exercise our sensibility."

There are two methods of regarding the division of the canvas, according to Metzinger and Gleizes, (1) "all the parts are connected by a rhythmic convention", giving the painting a centre from which the gradations of colour proceed (or towards which they tend), creating spaces of maximum or minimum intensity. (2) "The spectator, himself free to establish unity, may apprehend all the elements in the order assigned to them by creative intuition, the properties of each portion must be left independent, and the plastic continuum must be broken into a thousand surprises of light and shade."

There is nothing real outside ourselves; there is nothing real except the coincidence of a sensation and an individual mental direction. Far be it from us to throw any doubts upon the existence of the objects which strike our senses; but, rationally speaking, we can only have certitude with regard to the images which they produce in the mind.

— Metzinger and Gleizes, 1912

Jean Metzinger, 1912, Femme à l'Éventail (Woman with a Fan), oil on canvas, 90.7 × 64.2 cm. Exhibited at the Salon d'Automne, 1912, Paris. Published in Les Peintres Cubistes, by Guillaume Apollinaire, 1913. Solomon R. Guggenheim Museum, New York

According to the founders of Cubist theory, objects possess no absolute or essential form. "There are as many images of an object as there are eyes which look at it; there are as many essential images of it as there are minds which comprehend it."

== Theoretical underpinnings ==
The idea of moving around an object in order to see it from different view-points is treated in Du "Cubisme" (1912). It was also a central idea of Jean Metzinger's Note sur la Peinture, 1910; Indeed, prior to Cubism painters worked from the limiting factor of a single view-point. And it was Metzinger for the first time in Note sur la peinture who enunciated the stimulating interest in representing objects as remembered from successive and subjective experiences within the context of both space and time. It was then that Metzinger discarded traditional perspective and granted himself the liberty of moving around objects. This is the concept of "mobile perspective" that would tend towards the representation of the "total image".

Though at first the idea would shock the general public some eventually came to accept it, as they came to accept the 'atomist' representation of the universe as a multitude of dots consisting of primary colors. Just as each color is modified by its relation to adjacent colors within the context of Neo-Impressionist color theory, so too the object is modified by the geometric forms adjacent to it within the context of Cubism. The concept of 'mobile perspective' is essentially an extension of a similar principle stated in Paul Signac's D'Eugène Delacroix au néo-impressionisme, with respect to color. Only now, the idea is extended to deal with questions of form within the context of both space and time.

== Salon d'Automne, 1912 ==
L'Excelsior, Au Salon d'Automne, Les Indépendants, 2 October 1912, with works by Metzinger (Dancer in a café), Gleizes (Man on a Balcony), Kupka (Amorpha, Fugue in Two Colors) and de La Fresnaye

Paintings by Fernand Léger, 1912, La Femme en Bleu (Woman in Blue), Kunstmuseum Basel; Jean Metzinger, 1912, Dancer in a café, Albright-Knox Art Gallery; and sculpture by Alexander Archipenko, 1912, La Vie Familiale (Family Life). Published in Les Annales politiques et littéraires, n. 1529, 13 October 1912

The Salon d'Automne of 1912, held in Paris at the Grand Palais from 1 October to 8 November, saw the Cubists (listed below) regrouped into the same room XI. For the occasion, Danseuse au café was reproduced in a photograph published in an article entitled Au Salon d'Automne "Les Indépendants" in the French newspaper Excelsior, 2 Octobre 1912. Excelsior was the first publication to privilege photographic illustrations in the treatment of news media; shooting photographs and publishing images in order to tell news stories. As such L'Excelsior was a pioneer of photojournalism.

The history of the Salon d'Automne is marked by two important dates: 1905, bore witness to the birth of Fauvism (with the participation of Metzinger), and 1912, the xenophobe and anti-modernist quarrel. The 1912 polemic leveled against both the French and non-French avant-garde artists originated in Salle XI where the Cubists exhibited their works. The resistance to foreigners (dubbed "apaches") and avant-garde artists was just the visible face of a more profound crises: that of defining modern French art, and the dwindling of an artistic system crystallized around the heritage of Impressionism centered in Paris. Burgeoning was a new avant-garde system, the international logic of which—mercantile and médiatique—put into question the modern ideology elaborated upon since the late 19th century. What had begun as a question of aesthetics quickly turned political, and as in the 1905 Salon d'Automne, with his infamous "Donatello chez les fauves", the critic Louis Vauxcelles (Les Arts, 1912) was most implicated in the deliberations. Recall too, it was Vauxcelles who, on the occasion of the 1910 Salon des Indépendants, wrote disparagingly of 'pallid cubes' with reference to the paintings of Metzinger, Gleizes, Le Fauconnier, Léger and Delaunay.

The Cubist contribution to the 1912 Salon d'Automne created scandal regarding the use of government owned buildings, such as the Grand Palais, to exhibit such artwork. The indignation of the politician Jean Pierre Philippe Lampué made the front page of Le Journal, 5 October 1912. On 3 December 1912 the controversy spread to the Municipal Council of Paris. A debate transpired in the Chambre des Députés about the use of public funds to provide the venue for such art. The Cubists were defended by the Socialist deputy, Marcel Sembat.

- Jean Metzinger entered three works: Dancer in a café (simply entitled Danseuse), La Plume Jaune (The Yellow Feather), Femme à l'Éventail (Woman with a Fan) (now at the Solomon R. Guggenheim Museum, New York), hung in the decorative arts section inside La Maison Cubiste (the Cubist House).
- Fernand Léger exhibited La Femme en Bleu (Woman in Blue), 1912 (Kunstmuseum, Basel) and Le passage à niveau (The Level Crossing), 1912 (Fondation Beyeler, Riehen, Switzerland)
- Roger de La Fresnaye, Les Baigneuse (The bathers) 1912 (The National Gallery, Washington) and Les joueurs de cartes (Card Players)
- Henri Le Fauconnier, The Huntsman (Haags Gemeentemuseum, The Hague, Netherlands) and Les Montagnards attaqués par des ours (Mountaineers Attacked by Bears), 1912 (Museum of Art, Rhode Island School of Design).
- Albert Gleizes, l'Homme au Balcon (Man on a Balcony), (Portrait of Dr. Théo Morinaud), 1912 (Philadelphia Museum of Art), also exhibited at the Armory Show, New York, Chicago, Boston, 1913.
- André Lhote, Le jugement de Paris, 1912 (Private collection)
- František Kupka, Amorpha, Fugue à deux couleurs (Fugue in Two Colors), 1912 (Narodni Galerie, Prague), and Amorpha Chromatique Chaude.
- Francis Picabia, 1912, La Source (The Spring) (Museum of Modern Art, New York)
- Alexander Archipenko, Family Life, 1912, sculpture
- Amedeo Modigliani, exhibited four elongated and highly stylized heads), sculptures
- Joseph Csaky exhibited the sculptures Groupe de femmes, 1911–1912 (location unknown), Portrait de M.S.H., no. 91 (location unknown), and Danseuse (Femme à l'éventail, Femme à la cruche), no. 405 (location unknown)

This exhibition also featured La Maison Cubiste. Raymond Duchamp-Villon designed façade of a 10-by-3-metre (32.8 ft × 9.8 ft) house, which included a hall, a living room and a bedroom. This installation was placed in the Art Décoratif section of the Salon d'Automne. The major contributors were André Mare, a decorative designer, Roger de La Fresnaye, Jacques Villon and Marie Laurencin. In the house were hung cubist paintings by Marcel Duchamp, Albert Gleizes, Fernand Léger, Roger de La Fresnaye, and Jean Metzinger (Woman with a Fan, 1912).

Reviewing the Salon d'Automne Roger Allard commended Metzinger's 'finesse and distinction of palette'. Maurice Raynal noted the seductive charm and sureness of execution of Metzinger's entries, the refined sensibility of Metzinger himself, the playfulness and grace of whom he compares to Pierre-Auguste Renoir, while singling out Metzinger as "certainly ... the man of our time who knows best how to paint".

In a review of the exhibition published in Le Petit Parisien, art critic Jean Claude writes of entries by Léger, Gleizes and Metzinger: "Mr. Léger walked his brush on the canvas after having dipped them in blue, black, red and brown. It is stupefying to look at. The catalog says it's a Woman in blue. Poor woman. Man on a Balcony, by Mr. Gleizes, is more comprehensible. At least in the chaos of cubes and trapezoids we find a man. I will say as much for the entry of Mr. Metzinger, Dancers. It has the effect of a puzzle that is not assembled properly".

== Provenance ==
- Albert Gleizes collection
- Robert Lebel, acquired from Albert Gleizes; sold to Sidney Janis Gallery, between 1955 and 1956
- Sidney Janis Gallery, between 1955 and 1956, January 11, 1957 (purchased from Robert Lebel, Paris, sold to the Albright Art Gallery, January 11, 1957)

== See also ==
- List of works by Jean Metzinger
