= La Maison Cubiste =

1912 architectural installation

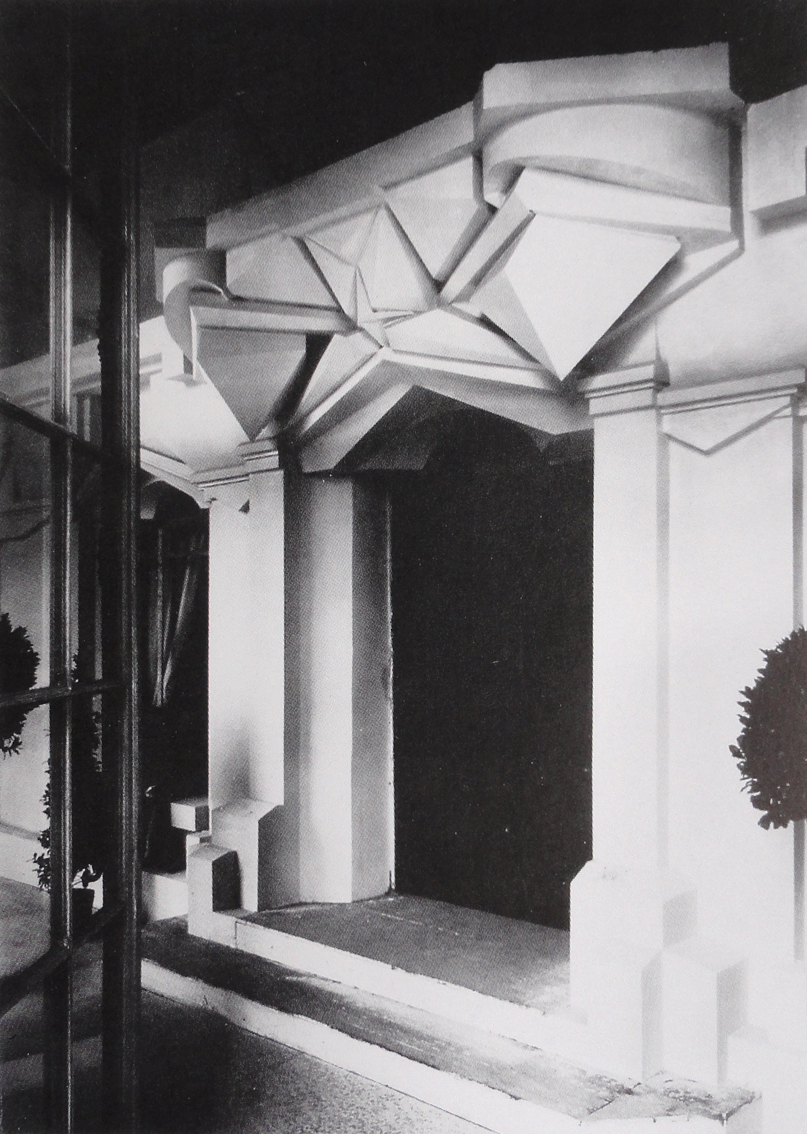
Raymond Duchamp-Villon, 1912, La Maison Cubiste (Cubist House) at the Salon d'Automne, 1912, detail of the entrance; Façade architecturale (destroyed)

La Maison Cubiste (The Cubist House), also called Projet d'hôtel, was an architectural installation in the Art Décoratif section of the 1912 Paris Salon d'Automne which presented a Cubist vision of architecture and design. Critics and collectors present at the exhibition were confronted for the first time with the prospect of a Cubist architecture.

The facade was designed by the sculptor Raymond Duchamp-Villon. The interior design of the house was conceived by the painter and designer André Mare, in collaboration with Cubist artists from the Section d'Or group.

== Description ==
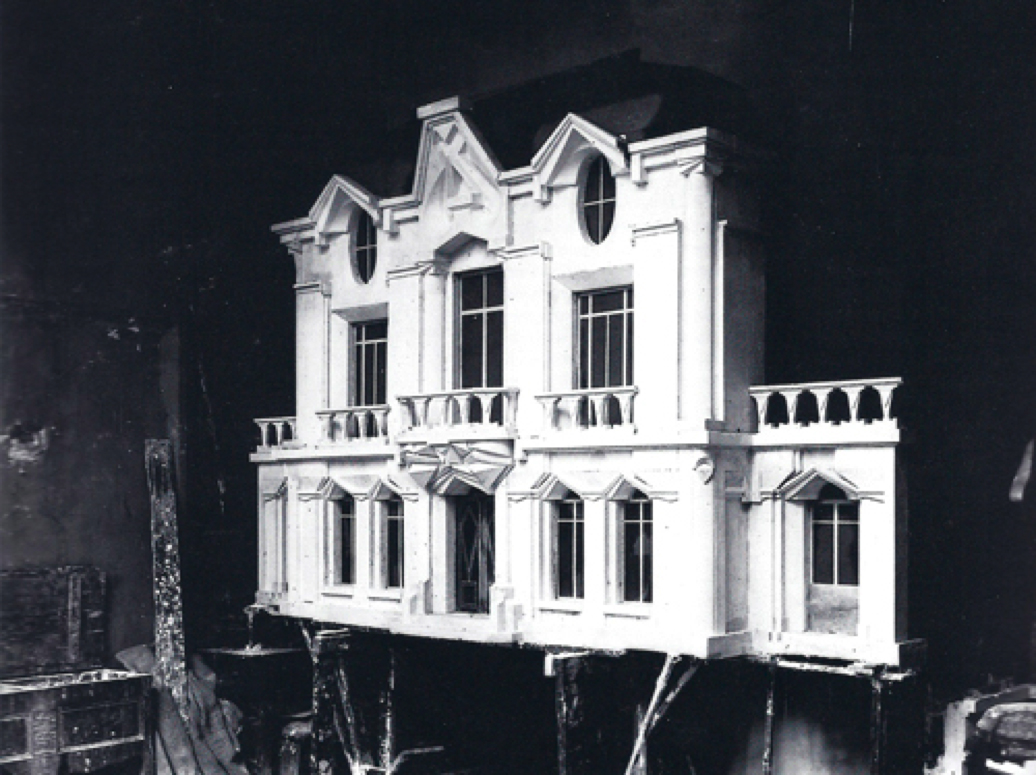
Raymond Duchamp-Villon, original model of the architectural facade (destroyed)

La Maison Cubiste had a 10 by 8 meter plaster facade with highly geometric trim, behind which were two furnished rooms; a living room (Salon Bourgeois) and a bedroom. Paintings by Albert Gleizes, Jean Metzinger, Marie Laurencin, Marcel Duchamp, Fernand Léger and Roger de La Fresnaye were hung in the salon. Thousands of spectators at the salon passed through the full-scale model.

== Decoration ==
While the facade and paintings in the installation were inspired by cubism, the decoration of the interior, by André Mare, was also one of the first important examples of Art Deco. Mare, a painter, worked with a group of artists to design the wallpaper, upholstery, cushions, carpets and other decoration of the rooms. The decoration featured bright colors and floral patterns, particularly stylized garlands and bouquets of roses, which became one of the major themes of early Art Deco. The fame of the Maison Cubiste launched the career of Mare; after the First World War, he co-founded a design company, the Compagnie des arts Francais, with Louis Suë. He designed two major pavilions and the main entrance of the 1925 Exposition des Arts Decoratifs, which gave Art Deco its name, and later designed the interiors of famous French transatlantic ocean liners, including the SS Île de France.

== Legacy ==
It was an early example of art décoratif, a home within which Cubist art could be displayed in the comfort and style of modern, bourgeois life. Cubism was recognized as significant to a broad range of applications, beyond the bounds of fine art. The movement opened the way toward new possibilities, a modern geometrical vision that could be adapted to architecture, interior design, graphic arts, fashion and industrial design; the basis of Art Deco.

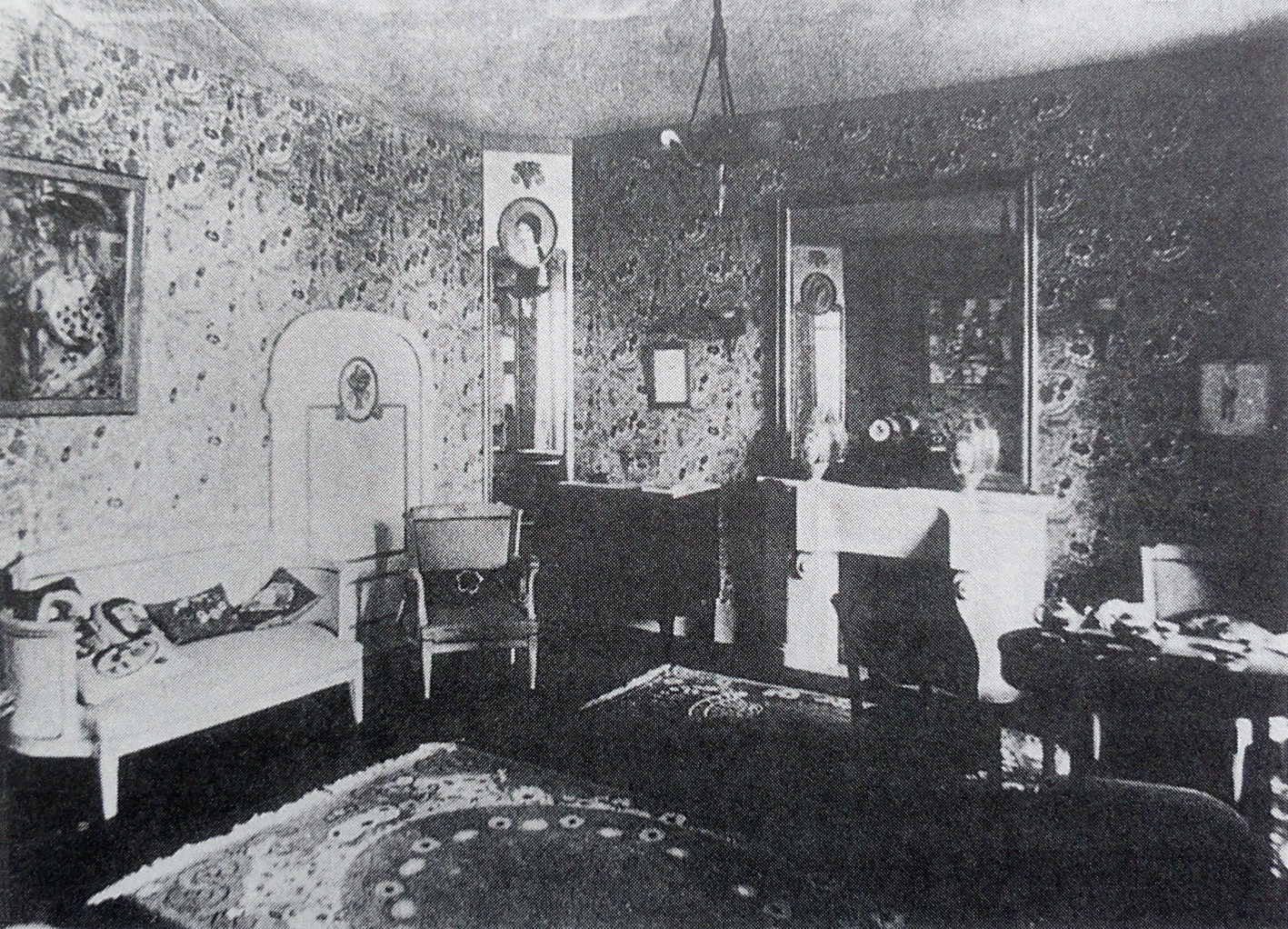
Le Salon Bourgeois, designed by André Mare inside La Maison Cubiste, in the decorative arts section of the Salon d'Automne, 1912, Paris. Metzinger's Femme à l'Éventail on the left wall

Mare called the living room in which Cubist paintings were hung the Salon Bourgeois. Léger described this name as 'perfect'. In a letter to Mare prior to the exhibition Léger writes: "Your idea is absolutely splendid for us, really splendid. People will see Cubism in its domestic setting, which is very important."

The facade of the house (Façade architecturale), designed by Raymond Duchamp-Villon, was not very radical by modern standards; the lintels and pediments had prismatic shapes, but otherwise the facade resembled an ordinary house of the period. The rooms were furnished in a bourgeois, colorful, and rather traditional manner, particularly compared with the paintings. The critic Emile Sedeyn described Mare's work in the magazine Art et Décoration: "He does not embarrass himself with simplicity, for he multiplies flowers wherever they can be put. The effect he seeks is obviously one of picturesqueness and gaiety. He achieves it." The Cubist element was provided by the paintings. Despite its tameness, the installation was attacked by some critics as extremely radical, which helped make for its success. This architectural installation was subsequently exhibited at the 1913 Armory Show, New York, Chicago and Boston.

== Cubist theory ==
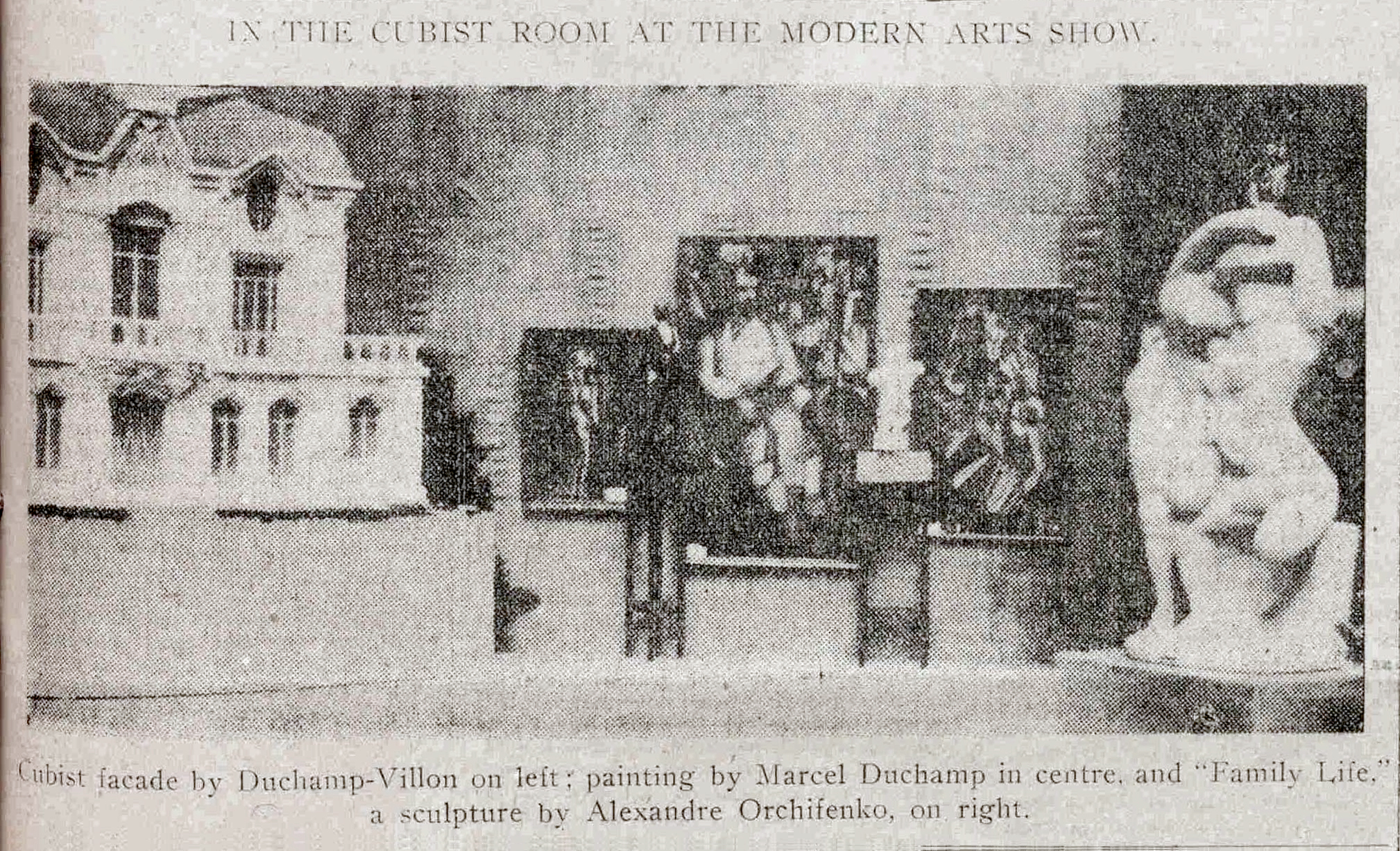
The Armory Show Cubist room, published in the New York Tribune, February 17, 1913 (p. 7). Left to right: Raymond Duchamp-Villon, La Maison Cubiste; Marcel Duchamp Nude (Study), Sad Young Man on a Train; Albert Gleizes, L'Homme au Balcon, Man on a Balcony; Marcel Duchamp, Nude Descending a Staircase, No. 2; Alexander Archipenko, La Vie Familiale, Family Life

Metzinger and Gleizes in Du "Cubisme", written during the assemblage of La Maison Cubiste, described the autonomous nature of art, stressing the point that decorative considerations should not govern the spirit of art. Decorative work was called the "antithesis of the picture". "The true picture" wrote Metzinger and Gleizes, "bears its raison d'être within itself. It can be moved from a church to a drawing-room, from a museum to a study. Essentially independent, necessarily complete, it need not immediately satisfy the mind: on the contrary, it should lead it, little by little, towards the fictitious depths in which the coordinative light resides. It does not harmonize with this or that ensemble; it harmonizes with things in general, with the universe: it is an organism..."

"Mare's ensembles were accepted as frames for Cubist works because they allowed paintings and sculptures their independence", wrote Christopher Green, "creating a play of contrasts, hence the involvement not only of Gleizes and Metzinger themselves, but of Marie Laurencin, the Duchamp brothers (Raymond Duchamp-Villon designed the facade) and Mare's old friends Léger and Roger La Fresnaye". For the occasion, an article entitled Au Salon d'Automne "Les Indépendants" was published in the French newspaper Excelsior, 2 Octobre 1912. Excelsior was the first publication to privilege photographic illustrations in the treatment of news media; shooting photographs and publishing images in order to tell news stories. As such L'Excelsior was a pioneer of photojournalism.

Walter Pach, president of the landmark 1913 exhibition known as the Armory Show, wrote a pamphlet for the occasion, "A Sculptor’s Architecture", in which he discussed Duchamp–Villon's La Maison Cubiste as exemplary of a new architectural style for the modern era. "[T]his work of M. Duchamp-Villon's is an example of what possibilities are contained in a style like the present one whose philosophy is a base", writes Pach, "not a limitation." Continuing, Pach writes, "His work in architecture is by no means a turning aside from his sculpture, but a furthering of it. In the present facade he has simply a "subject" whose organization was to be developed from the forms suggested by a man or woman."

When the art collector Michael Stein, brother of Gertrude Stein, first introduced the work of Duchamp-Villon to Pach, he noted that it would be "admirably suited to the needs of building with concrete". Pach agreed. But speaking with the sculptor convinced Pach that this style had its first application to building with stone, and that it emerged from "an appreciation and solution of the new problem of steel and stone."

The final word I would speak about this architecture is its quality of response to the needs of America. We have yet enormous areas that will be built up into cities, we are going to tear down and rebuild most of the edifices, that already exist. With the freedom that this order gives to individual development and with its possibilities of expansion to make it suit the largest building as well as the smallest, it seems to clearly fix the type of our ideal. Before a photograph of the sky-scrapers of Manhattan Island, Raymond Duchamp-Villon said that he saw the possibilities of the modern cathedral. (Walter Pach, 1913)

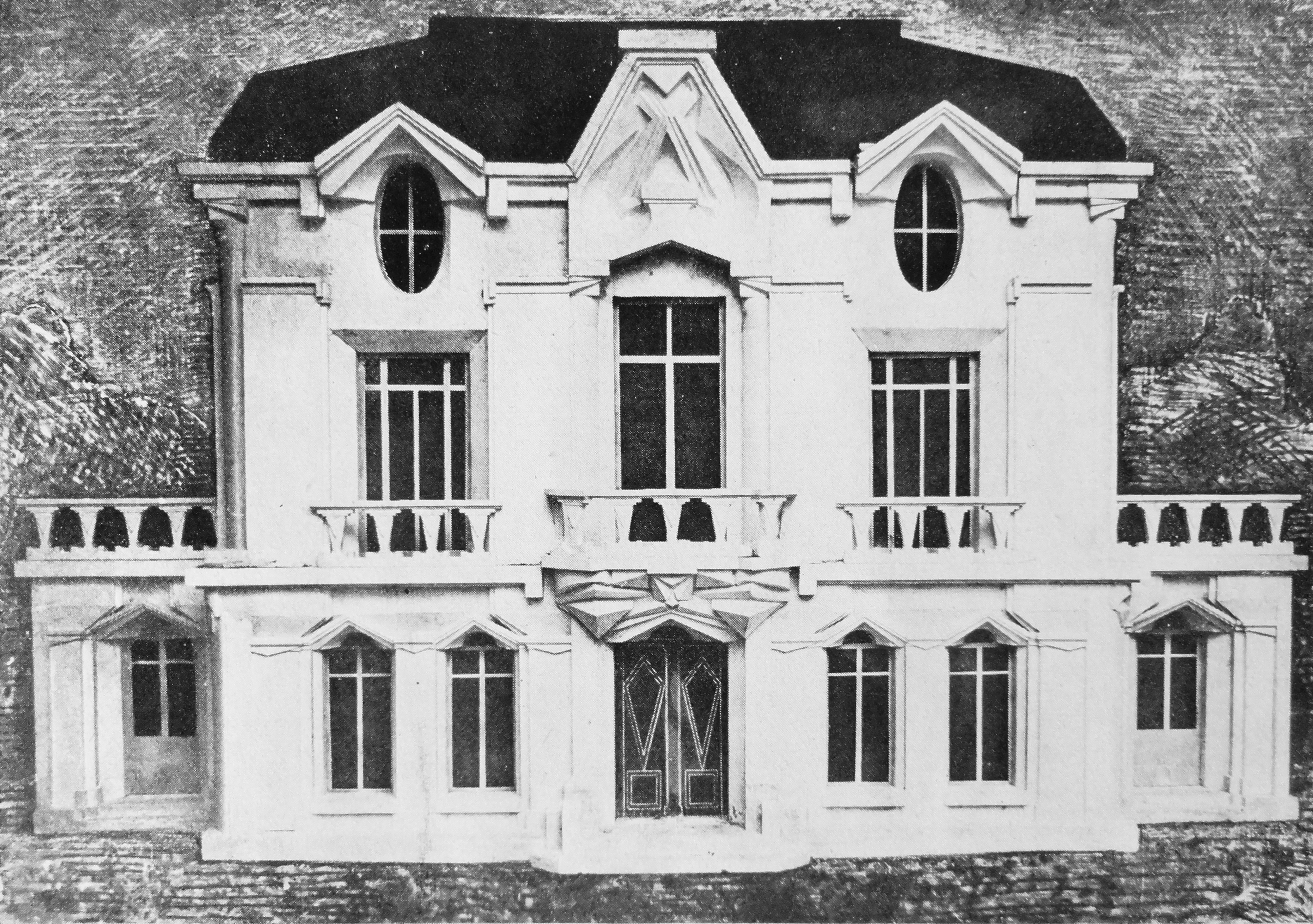
Design for the facade of the Maison Cubiste (Cubist House) by Raymond Duchamp-Villon (1912)

Jean Metzinger, 1912, Femme à l'Éventail (Woman with a Fan), oil on canvas, 90.7 x 64.2 cm, Solomon R. Guggenheim Museum, New York, displayed in the Salon Bourgeois of the installation

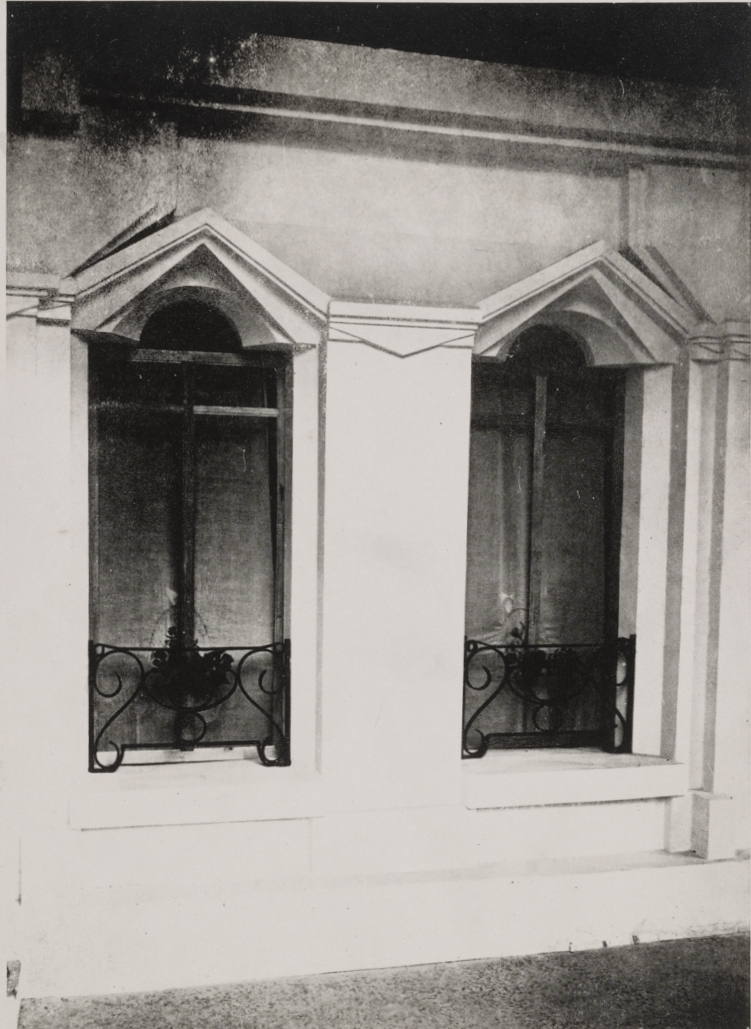
Raymond Duchamp-Villon, 1912, Projet d'hôtel, La Maison Cubiste (Cubist House) detail, Armory Show records, Archives of American Art

== Influence ==
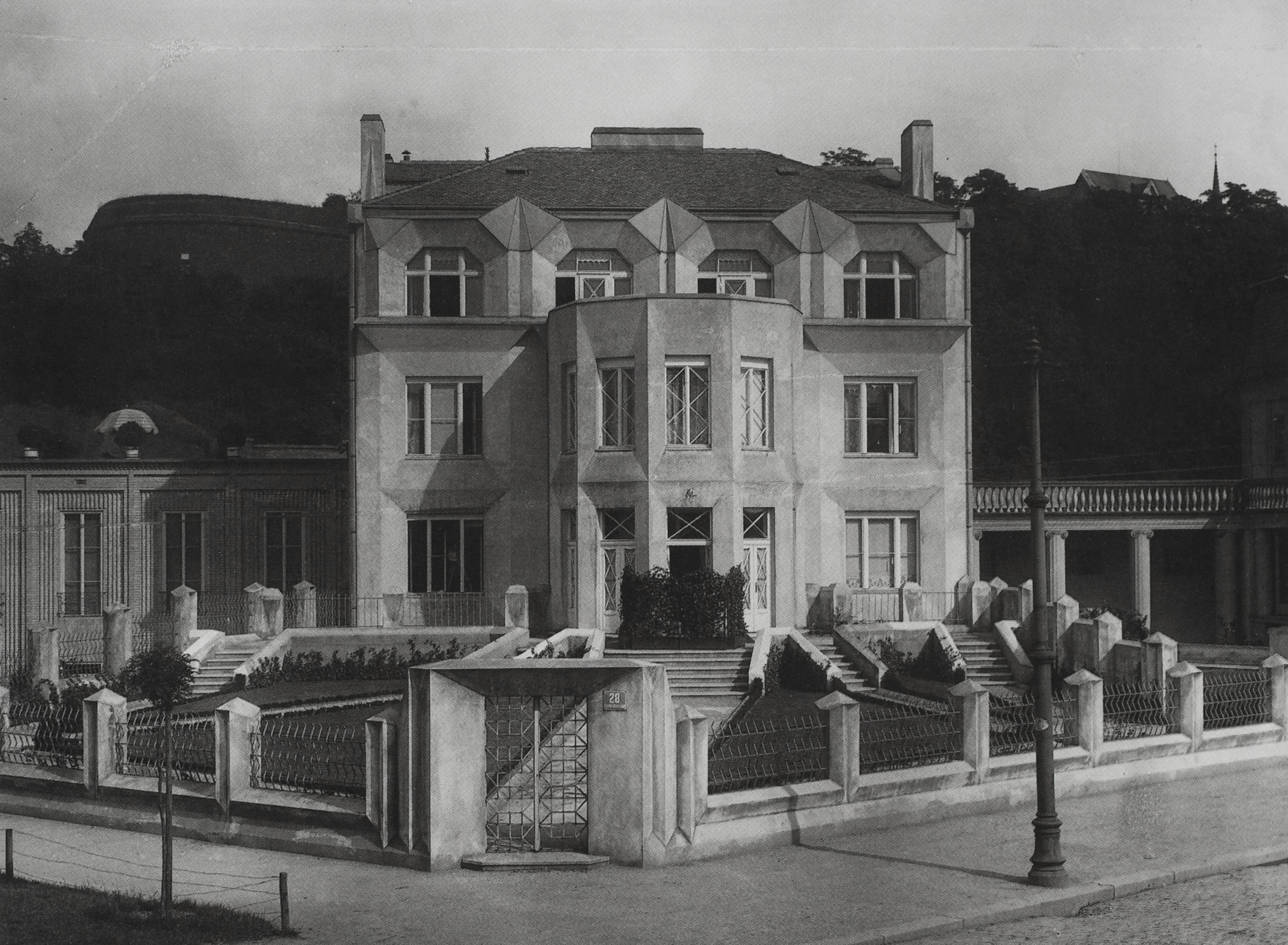
Josef Chochol, 1912–13, Cubist villa in Libušina Street 3-49, Vyšehrad, Prague, Czech Republic. Chochol was one of three Czech architects (members of the Mánes Union of Fine Arts), with Pavel Janák and Josef Gočár, influenced by Cubism

It is difficult to measure the influence of the Maison Cubiste. No actual house following the same design was ever built, and later Deco and modernist residences followed very different models. However, the house was a great success in emphasizing the role of Cubism as an alternative to traditional art and design. The scandal in the press caused by the paintings displayed there was a major contributor to the popularity of Cubist art. Thanks largely to the popularity of the exposition, the term "Cubist" began to be applied to anything modern, from women's haircuts to clothing to theater performances.

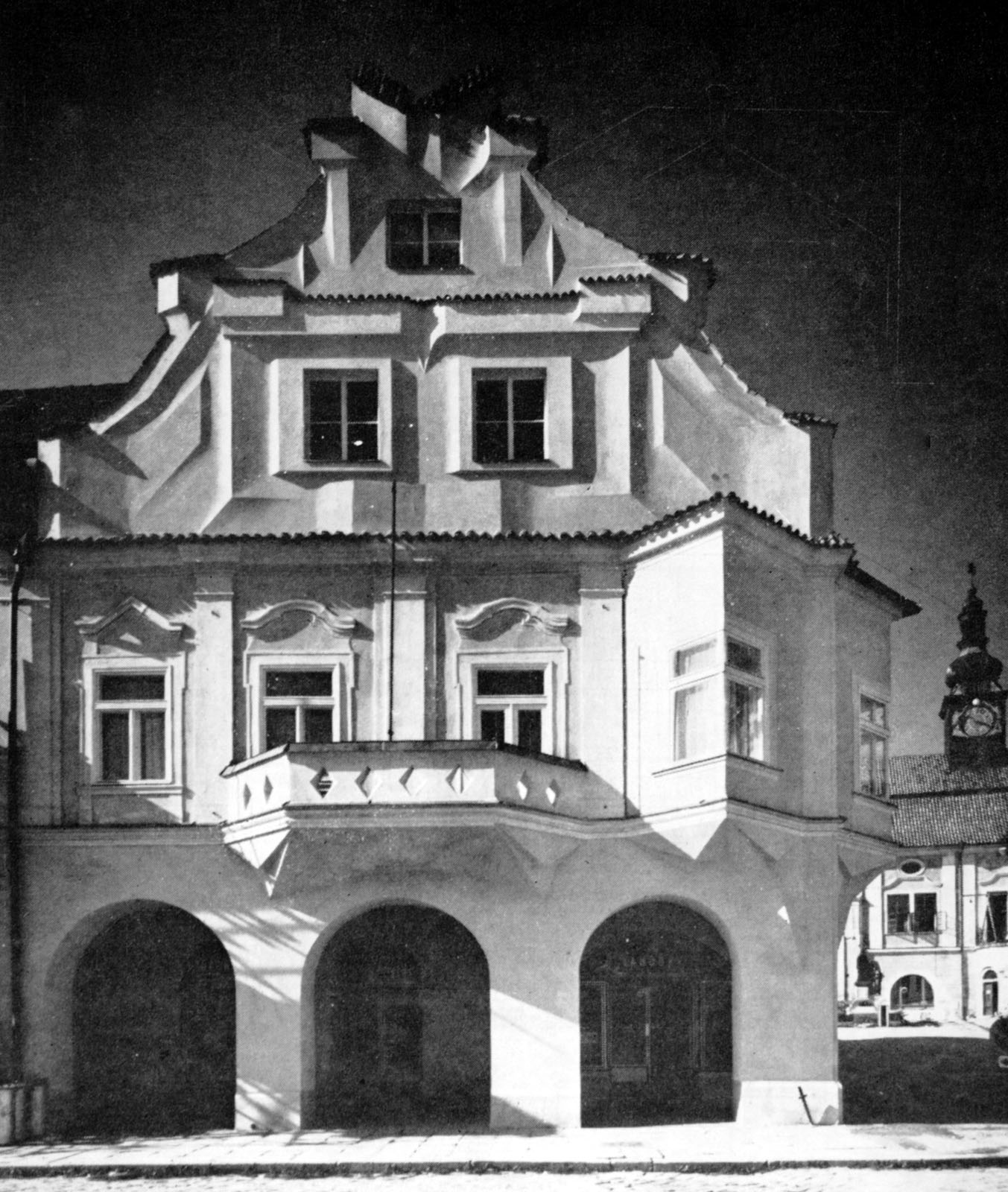
Fara House in Pelhřimov, Czech Republic, with a baroque facade rebuilt by Pavel Janák in the Cubist House style (1913)

Le Corbusier had reportedly been enthused by La Maison Cubiste during the 1912 exhibition. "He saw in it important solutions for the problem of building with cement." Le Corbusier subsequently exhibited his model for Maison Citrohan (a mass production prototype) at the Salon d'Automne of 1922. He later built the Pavillon de l'Esprit Nouveau for the L'Exposition internationale des arts décoratifs et industriels modernes, 1925, Paris, the event which gave Art Deco its name. The undecorated rectangular box of the Esprit Nouveau Pavilion, however, bore no resemblance to the Cubist House.

No buildings like the Cubist House were built in France, but the model did have an impact in Czechoslovakia (now the Czech Republic) then part of the Austro-Hungarian Empire, where architects wanted to show their independence from the Viennese style. In 1913 the Czech architect Pavel Janák was commissioned to reconstruct the facade of a large baroque house, the Fara House in the town of Pelhrimov in south Bohemia, in the cubist style. Janák redid the baroque facade by adding angular geometric forms similar to those on the model of the cubist house in Paris. Because of this quest for architectural independence from Austria, many art deco houses, mostly in the later more typical Deco style, are found in Prague and other cities in the Czech Republic.
