= Man on a Balcony =

Painting by Albert Gleizes

- L'Homme au balcon (French)
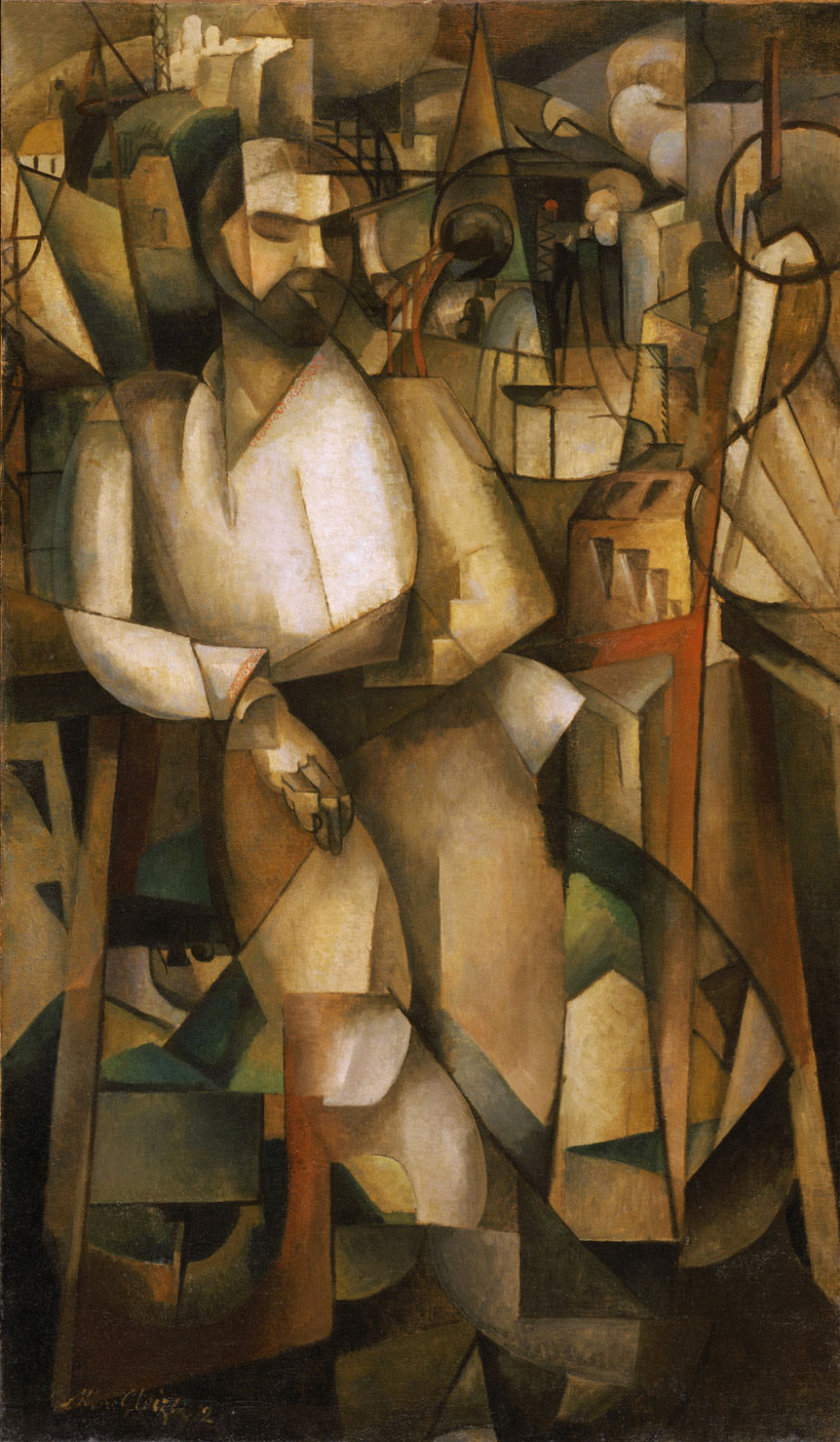
- Artist: Albert Gleizes
- Year: 1912
- Medium: Oil on canvas
- Dimensions: 195.6 cm × 114.9 cm (77 in × 45.25 in)
- Location: Philadelphia Museum of Art; Philadelphia

Man on a Balcony (also known as Portrait of Dr. Théo Morinaud and 'L'Homme au balcon), is a large oil painting created in 1912 by the French artist, theorist and writer Albert Gleizes (1881–1953). The painting was exhibited in Paris at the Salon d'Automne of 1912 (no. 689). The Cubist contribution to the salon created a controversy in the French Parliament about the use of public funds to provide the venue for such 'barbaric art'. Gleizes was a founder of Cubism, and demonstrates the principles of the movement in this monumental painting (over six feet tall) with its projecting planes and fragmented lines. The large size of the painting reflects Gleizes's ambition to show it in the large annual salon exhibitions in Paris, where he was able with others of his entourage to bring Cubism to wider audiences.

In February 1913, Gleizes and other artists introduced the new style of modern art known as Cubism to an American audience at the Armory Show in New York City, Chicago and Boston. In addition to Man on a balcony (no. 196), Gleizes exhibited his 1910 painting Femme aux Phlox (Museum of Fine Arts, Houston).

Man on a Balcony was reproduced in L'Excelsior, Au Salon d'Automne, Les Indépendants, 2 October 1912. It was then reproduced in Les Peintres Cubistes, Méditations Esthétiques, a collection of essays by Guillaume Apollinaire published in 1913 The painting was completed around the same time as Albert Gleizes co-authored with Jean Metzinger a major treatise titled Du "Cubisme" (the first and only manifesto on Cubism). Man on a Balcony was purchased at the 1913 Armory Show by the lawyer, author, art critic, private art collector, and American proponent of Cubism Arthur Jerome Eddy for $540. Gleizes' Man on a Balcony was the frontispiece of Arthur Jerome Eddy's book Cubists and Post-Impressionism, March 1914. The painting later formed part of the Louise and Walter Conrad Arensberg Collection, 1950. It is currently in the permanent collection of the Philadelphia Museum of Art.

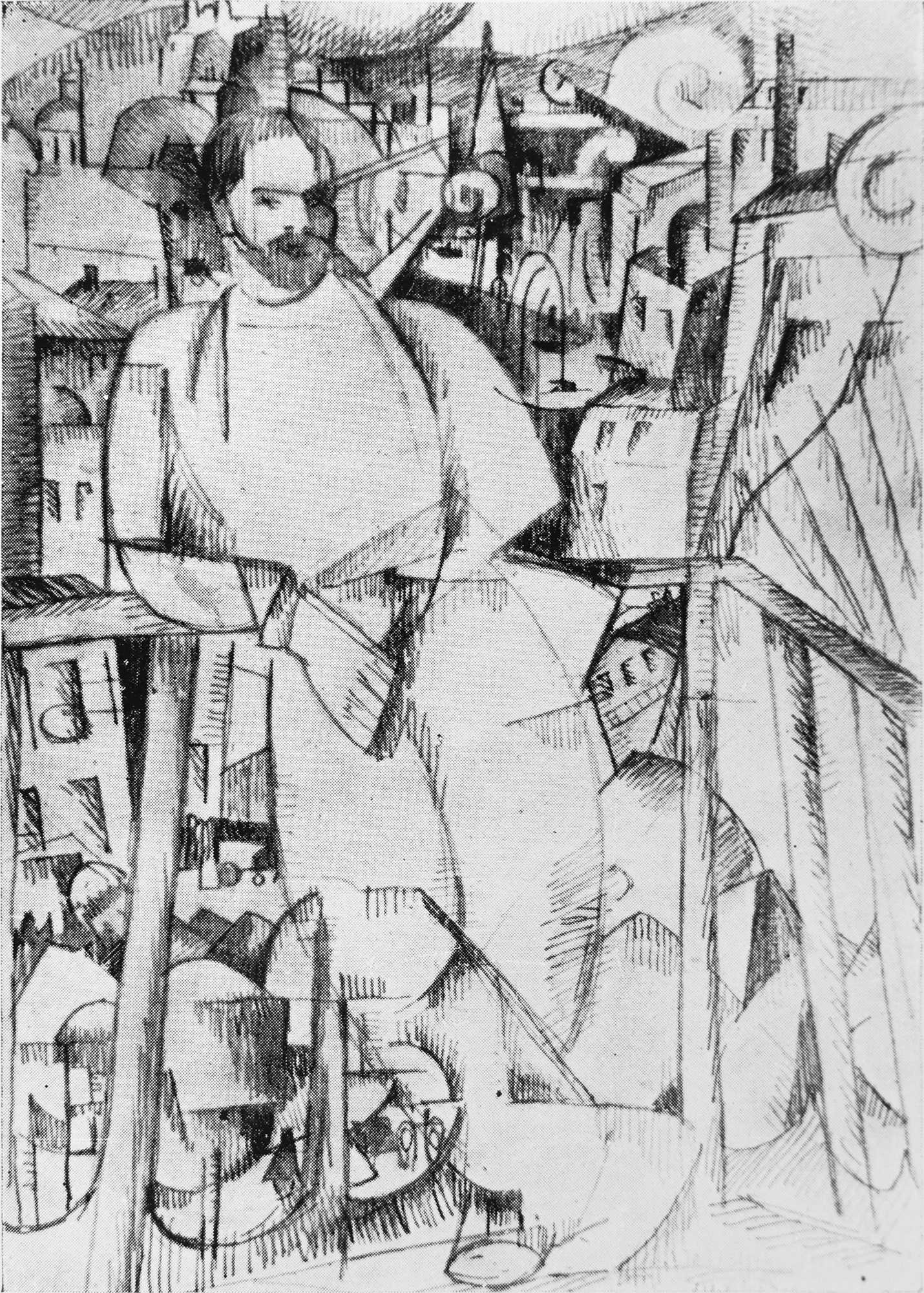
Albert Gleizes, 1912 (spring), Dessin pour L'Homme au balcon, exhibited Salon des Indépendants 1912

== Description ==
Man on a Balcony is a large oil painting on canvas with dimensions 195.6 x 114.9 cm (77 by 45.25 inches) signed and dated Albert Gleizes 12, lower left. Studies for this work began in the spring of 1912 while the full-figure portrait was probably completed during the late summer of 1912. A study for L'Homme au balcon was exhibited at the 1912 Salon des Indépendants and reproduced in Du "Cubisme".

Gleizes deliberately contrasts angular and curved shapes, while the tubular, block-like forms of the figure and head are derived directly from the principled of Cubism, as laid out in Du "Cubisme".

Daniel Robbins in Albert Gleizes 1881–1953, A Retrospective Exhibition, The Solomon R. Guggenheim Museum, New York, writes of Gleizes' Man on a Balcony:

This second portrait of Dr. Morinaud, probably from his office on Avenue de l'Opera, shows Gleizes again giving prominence to the curvilinear elements that had been important in his style in 1907-09. The painting became the subject of a lively debate between Marinetti and Lhote (La Vie des Lettres et des Arts, no. 16, 1922, p. 10,) in which the Futurist leader insisted that a Futurist painter would have attempted to "give the ensemble of visual sensations capable of being experienced by the person on the balcony". Lhote replied that such preoccupations were "literary" and "psychological", and outside the interests of the French Cubists. He was wrong for, although not primarily concerned with the reality of visual sensations, Gleizes was, nevertheless, deeply committed to symbolic and psychological relationships. (Daniel Robbins, 1964)

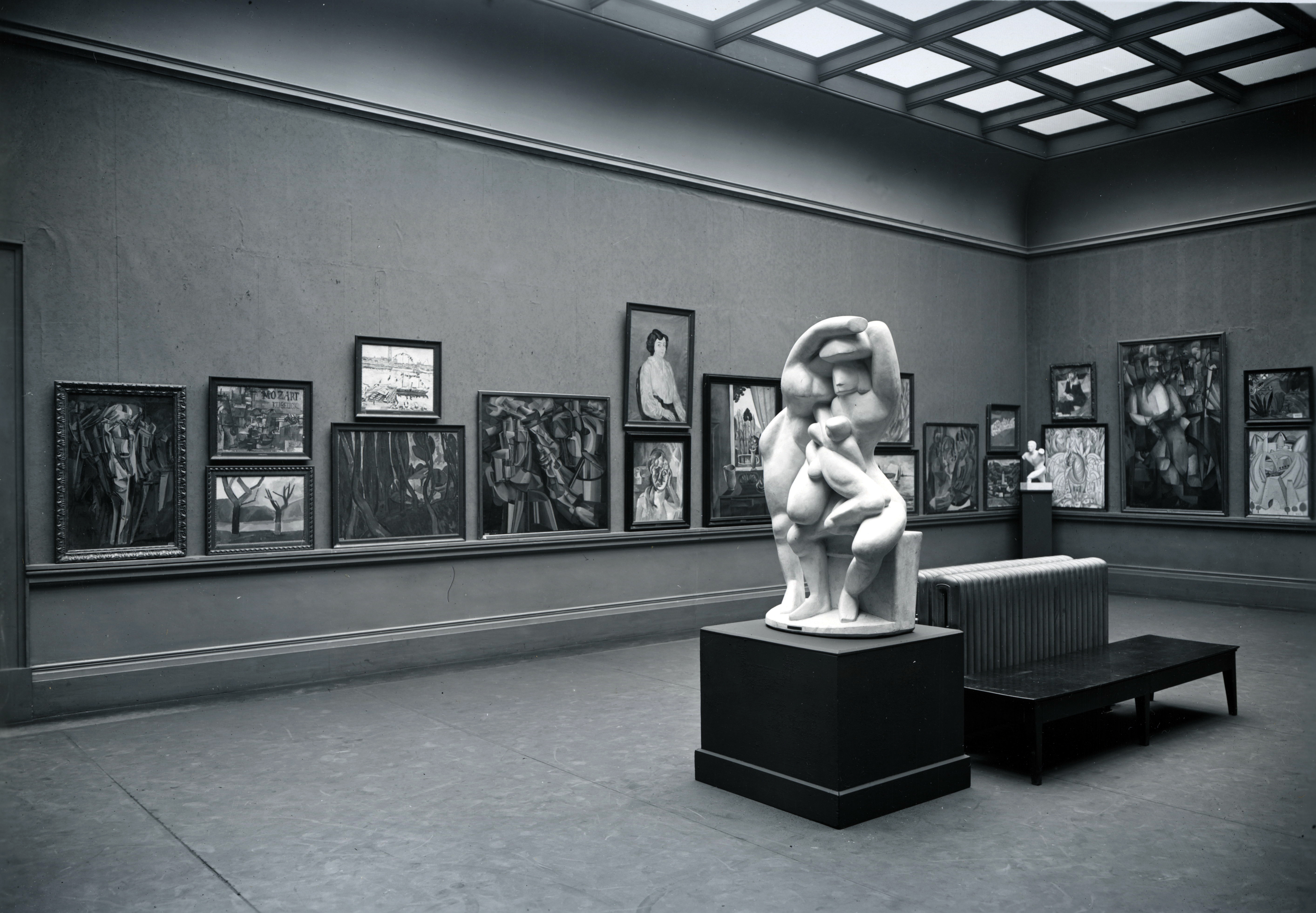
Armory Show, International Exhibition of Modern Art, Gallery 53 (northeast view), Art Institute of Chicago, March 24–April 16, 1913. L'Homme au Balcon is visible to the right. Works can be seen by Archipenko, the Duchamp brothers and others

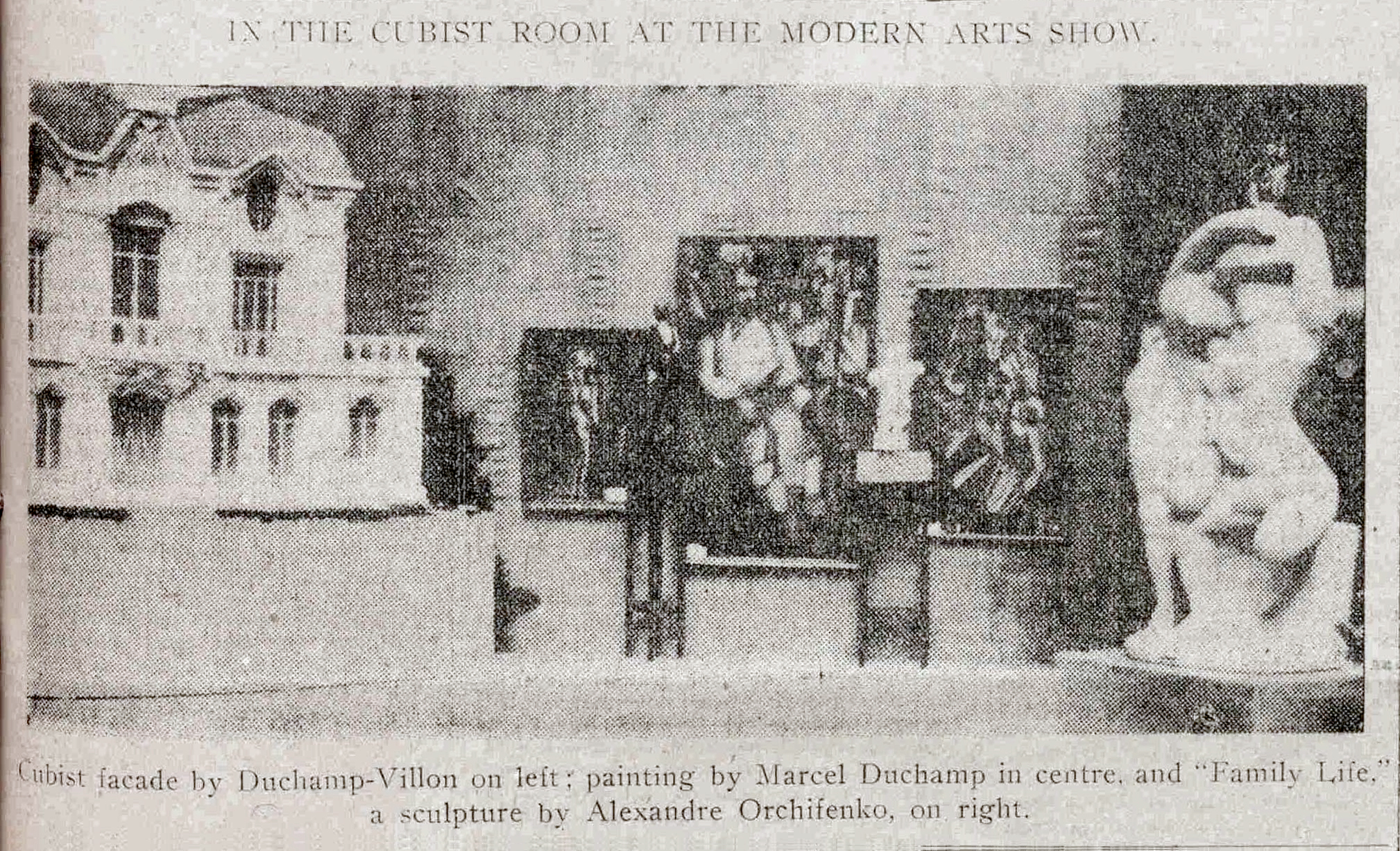
Installation shot of the Cubist room, 1913 Armory Show, published in the New York Tribune, February 17, 1913 (p. 7). Left to right: Raymond Duchamp-Villon, La Maison Cubiste (Projet d'Hotel), Cubist House; Marcel Duchamp Nude (Study), Sad Young Man on a Train (Nu [esquisse], jeune homme triste dans un train) 1911-12 (The Solomon R. Guggenheim Foundation, Peggy Guggenheim Collection, Venice); Albert Gleizes, l'Homme au Balcon, Man on a Balcony (Portrait of Dr. Théo Morinaud), 1912 (Philadelphia Museum of Art); Marcel Duchamp, Nude Descending a Staircase, No. 2; Alexander Archipenko, La Vie Familiale, Family Life (destroyed)

The figure of Dr. Théo Morinaud is intentionally still identifiable, unlike the degree of abstraction present within Marcel Duchamp’s Nude Descending a Staircase No. 2, on view in the same gallery at the Armory Show, and unlike The Dance at the Spring or The Procession, Seville by Francis Picabia, or Robert Delaunay's, Window on the City, No. 4. Essentially, the emphasis on simplified form—particularly those that comprise the Dr. Théo Morinaud—does not overwhelm the representational interest of the painting. In this painting the simplification of the representational form gives way to a new complexity in which foreground and background are united, and yet the subject of the painting is not obscured entirely by the network of interlocking geometrical elements. That is not to say that Gleizes sought to make a portrait of the Doctor Morinaud as he actually appeared. Neither in this portrait of Morinaud, Portrait of Igor Stravinsky, 1914 (The Museum of Modern Art, MoMA) or Gleizes' Portrait of Jacques Nayral, nor Picasso's portraits of Vollard, Uhde or Kahnweiler, had the artists sought as a primary goal resemblance with the sitters.

In Du "Cubisme", Gleizes and Metzinger attempted to clarify the distinction between the picture and decorative painting. And Gleizes, writing in The Epic, From immobile form to mobile form (first published in 1925), explains the key to the relationship that develops between the artwork and the viewer, between representation or abstraction of from:

The plastic results are determined by the technique. As we can see straightaway, it is not a matter of describing, nor is it a matter of abstracting from, anything that is external to itself. There is a concrete act that has to be realised, a reality to be produced - of the same order as that which everyone is prepared to recognise in music, at the lowest level of the esemplastic scale, and in architecture, at the highest. Like any natural, physical reality, painting, understood in this way, will touch anyone who knows how to enter into it, not through their opinions on something that exists independently of it, but through its own existence, through those inter-relations, constantly in movement, which enable us to transmit life itself. (Albert Gleizes)

Every artist of the Section d'Or agreed that painting no longer had to be imitative. Gleizes there was no exception. All were in agreement too that the great value of modern art lay in that conception synthesized from experience could be recreated in the mind of the observer. However, there was diversity in defining the constituents of the experience to be synthesized. For Gleizes, then, principles needed to be formulated and derived out of the internal necessity of particular subjects. Important was not just the outward physical aspects or traits of a subject. Gleizes would incorporate 'penetrations', 'recollections' and 'correspondences' (to use his terms) between the subject and the environment. What he knew or felt about the subject became just as fundamental to the outcome of the painting as what he saw in the subject. His conception involved the search for qualities and equivalencies that would relate seemingly disparate phenomena, comparing and identifying one property with another—for example, the elements of the urban background appear as an extension of the pensive Dr. Morinaud. "This is a fundamentally synthetic notion", as pointed out art historian Daniel Robbins, "that points to the unity or compatibility of things. Ironically", he continues, "it is this idea that Kahnweiler was to shape much later as Cubist metaphor in his monograph on Juan Gris".

After John Quinn, the largest buyer at the Armory Show was Arthur Jerome Eddy. Following his purchase of Gleizes' Man on a Balcony and of Jacques Villon's Jeune femme (Young Girl), he returned to the exhibition the following day and bought four more works, including Francis Picabia's Danse à la source (Dances at the Spring), Marcel Duchamp's Le Roi et la Reine entourés de nus vites, André Derain's La forêt (Forest at Martigues), and Maurice de Vlaminck's Rueil. Eddy writes of Man on a Balcony in his Cubists and Post-Impressionism, March 1914:

Of all the Cubist pictures exhibited, most people liked "The Man on the Balcony" best. Why?

Because it looked like a good painting of a man in armour.

"I like the 'Man in Armour,'" was an expression frequently heard.

All of which goes to show that appreciation is largely a matter of association rather than of knowledge and taste.

Tell the people it is not a man in armour, and immediately they ask, in a tone of disgust, "Then what is he?" and the picture they liked a moment before becomes ridiculous in their eyes. (Eddy, 1914)

Man on a Balcony, with its monumental architecture of semi-abstract elements, is an open declaration of the principles of Cubist painting. The composition exemplifies the Cubist style of reverberating lines and fractured planes as applied to the traditional format of the full-length portraiture. The treatment of the subject is sufficiently representational to permit the identification of the tall, elegant figure as Dr. Théo Morinaud, a dental surgeon in Paris.

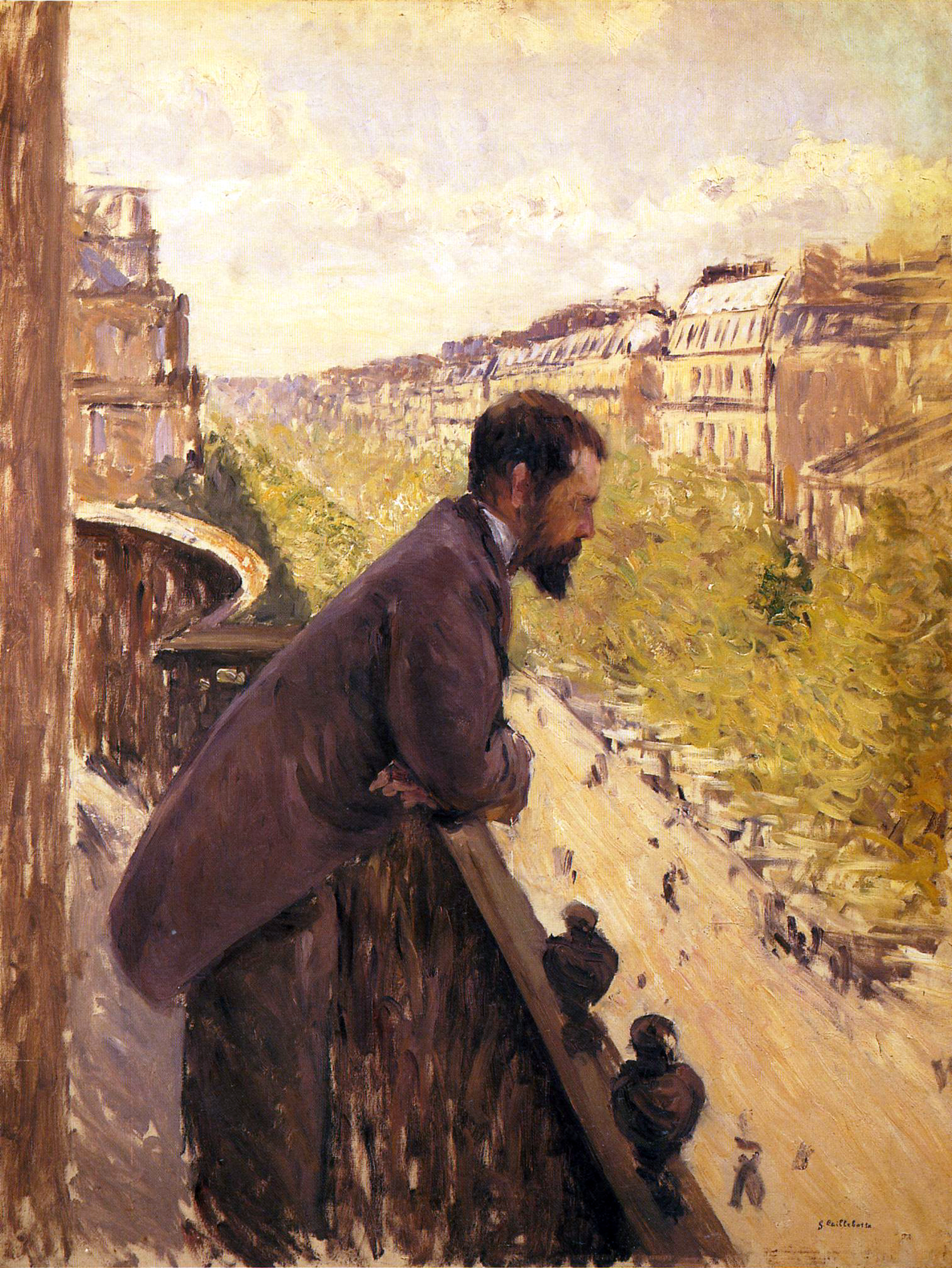
Gustave Caillebotte, c.1880, L'Homme au balcon (Man on a Balcony), oil on canvas, 116 x 97 cm, private collection

After the completion of both this work and the publication of Du "Cubisme", Gleizes became convinced that artists could explain themselves as well as or better than critics. He wrote and granted interviews during the following years when Du "Cubisme" was enjoying wide circulation and considerable success. While still 'readable' in the figurative or representational sense, Man on a Balcony demonstrates the mobile, dynamic fragmentation of form characteristic of Cubism at the artistic movements peak of 1912. Highly sophisticated both physically and in theory, this aspect of visualizing objects from several successive viewpoints called multiple perspective—different from illusion of motion associated with Futurism—would soon become ubiquitously identified with the practices of the Groupe de Puteaux.

The Man on a Balcony leans nonchalantly against a balustrade occupying the foreground of the composition. At first glance he appears bathed in natural light. But upon close examination there is no clear light source or direction from which the light emanates, giving the overall work the theatrical feeling of a stage set. Aimed at a wide audience, the models monumental three-dimensional presence 'gazes' at the spectator, while the spectator contemplates the painting in return. Just as in Gleizes' Le Chemin, Paysage à Meudon (1911) and Les Baigneuses (The Bathers) of the same year, there is present throughout an interplay of perpendicular lines and hyperbolic arcs that produce a rhythm that permeate the complex urban backdrop; here of smokestacks, train tracks, windows, bridge girders and clouds (the view from the balcony of the doctors office on the avenue de l'Opéra).

"Suggestive of the air, the space, and even the passage of time between these places are bubblelike shapes that emanate from the man to the animated urban panorama behind him. Gleizes's vocabulary becomes more experimental as he captures the cacophony and simultaneity of modern city life using a vocabulary of abbreviated, invented signs. The gray, ocher, beige, and brown colors, often identified with the rigor of Cubist thought, suggest the grimy, smoky city atmosphere, although Gleizes has enlivened this neutral palette by including bright greens and reds as well as creamy white highlights. The large size of the painting contrasts with the intimately scaled Cubist works of Picasso and Braque, reflecting the destination Gleizes envisioned for his work: the public salons of Paris, where he exhibited in the hope of bringing Cubism to wider audiences.

== Salon d'Automne, 1912 ==
L'Excelsior, Au Salon d'Automne, Les Indépendants, 2 October 1912, with works by Gleizes (Man on a Balcony), Jean Metzinger (Dancer in a café), František Kupka (Amorpha, Fugue in Two Colors) and Roger de La Fresnaye (Les joueurs de cartes, The Card Players)

Jean Metzinger, 1910-11, Paysage (whereabouts unknown); Gino Severini, 1911, La danseuse obsedante; Albert Gleizes, 1912, l'Homme au Balcon, Man on a Balcony (Portrait of Dr. Théo Morinaud). Published in Les Annales politiques et littéraires, Sommaire du n. 1536, December 1912

Paintings by Gino Severini, 1911, Souvenirs de Voyage; Albert Gleizes, 1912, Man on a Balcony, L’Homme au balcon; Severini, 1912-13, Portrait de Mlle Jeanne Paul-Fort; Luigi Russolo, 1911-12, La Révolte. Published in Les Annales politiques et littéraires, n. 1916, 14 March 1920

The Salon d'Automne of 1912, held in Paris at the Grand Palais from 1 October to 8 November, saw the Cubists (listed below) regrouped into the same room XI. For the occasion, Danseuse au café was reproduced in a photograph published in an article entitled Au Salon d'Automne "Les Indépendants" in the French newspaper Excelsior, 2 Octobre 1912. Excelsior was the first publication to privilege photographic illustrations in the treatment of news media; shooting photographs and publishing images in order to tell news stories. As such L'Excelsior was a pioneer of photojournalism.

The history of the Salon d'Automne is marked by two important dates: 1905, bore witness to the birth of Fauvism (with the participation of Metzinger), and 1912, the xenophobe and anti-modernist quarrel (with the participation of both Metzinger and Gleizes). The 1912 polemic leveled against both the French and non-French avant-garde artists originated in Salle XI where the Cubists exhibited their works. The resistance to avant-garde artists and foreigners (dubbed "apaches") was just the visible face of a more profound crises: that of defining modern French art, centered in Paris, and the dwindling of an artistic system crystallized around the heritage of Impressionism. Burgeoning was a new avant-garde system, the international logic of which—mercantile and médiatique—put into question the modern ideology elaborated upon since the late 19th century. What had begun as a question of aesthetics quickly turned political, and as in the 1905 Salon d'Automne, with his infamous "Donatello chez les fauves", the critic Louis Vauxcelles (Les Arts..., 1912) was most implicated in the deliberations. It was Vauxcelles who, on the occasion of the 1910 Salon des Indépendants, wrote disparagingly of 'pallid' cubes with reference to the paintings of Metzinger, Gleizes, Le Fauconnier, Léger and Delaunay.

On 3 December 1912 the polemic reached the Chambre des députés and was debated at the Assemblée Nationale in Paris.

- Albert Gleizes, exhibited l'Homme au Balcon (Man on a Balcony), (Portrait of Dr. Théo Morinaud) 1912 (Philadelphia Museum of Art), also exhibited at the Armory Show, New York, Chicago, Boston, 1913.
- Jean Metzinger entered three works: Dancer in cafe (Danseuse au café), La Plume Jaune (The Yellow Feather), Femme à l'Éventail (Woman with a Fan) (now at the Solomon R. Guggenheim Museum, New York), hung in the decorative arts section inside La Maison Cubiste (the Cubist House).
- Fernand Léger exhibited La Femme en Bleu (Woman in Blue), 1912 (Kunstmuseum, Basel) and Le passage à niveau (The Level Crossing), 1912 (Fondation Beyeler, Riehen, Switzerland)
- Roger de La Fresnaye, Les Baigneuse (The bathers) 1912 (The National Gallery, Washington) and Les joueurs de cartes (Card Players)
- Henri Le Fauconnier, The Huntsman (Haags Gemeentemuseum, The Hague, Netherlands) and Les Montagnards attaqués par des ours (Mountaineers Attacked by Bears) 1912 (Museum of Art, Rhode Island School of Design).
- André Lhote, Le jugement de Paris, 1912 (Private collection)
- František Kupka, Amorpha, Fugue à deux couleurs (Fugue in Two Colors), 1912 (Narodni Galerie, Prague), and Amorpha Chromatique Chaude.
- Francis Picabia, 1912, La Source (The Spring) (Museum of Modern Art, New York)
- Alexander Archipenko, Family Life, 1912, sculpture
- Amedeo Modigliani, exhibited four elongated and highly stylized heads, sculptures
- Joseph Csaky exhibited the sculptures Groupe de femmes, 1911-1912 (location unknown), Portrait de M.S.H., no. 91 (location unknown), and Danseuse (Femme à l'éventail, Femme à la cruche), no. 405 (location unknown)

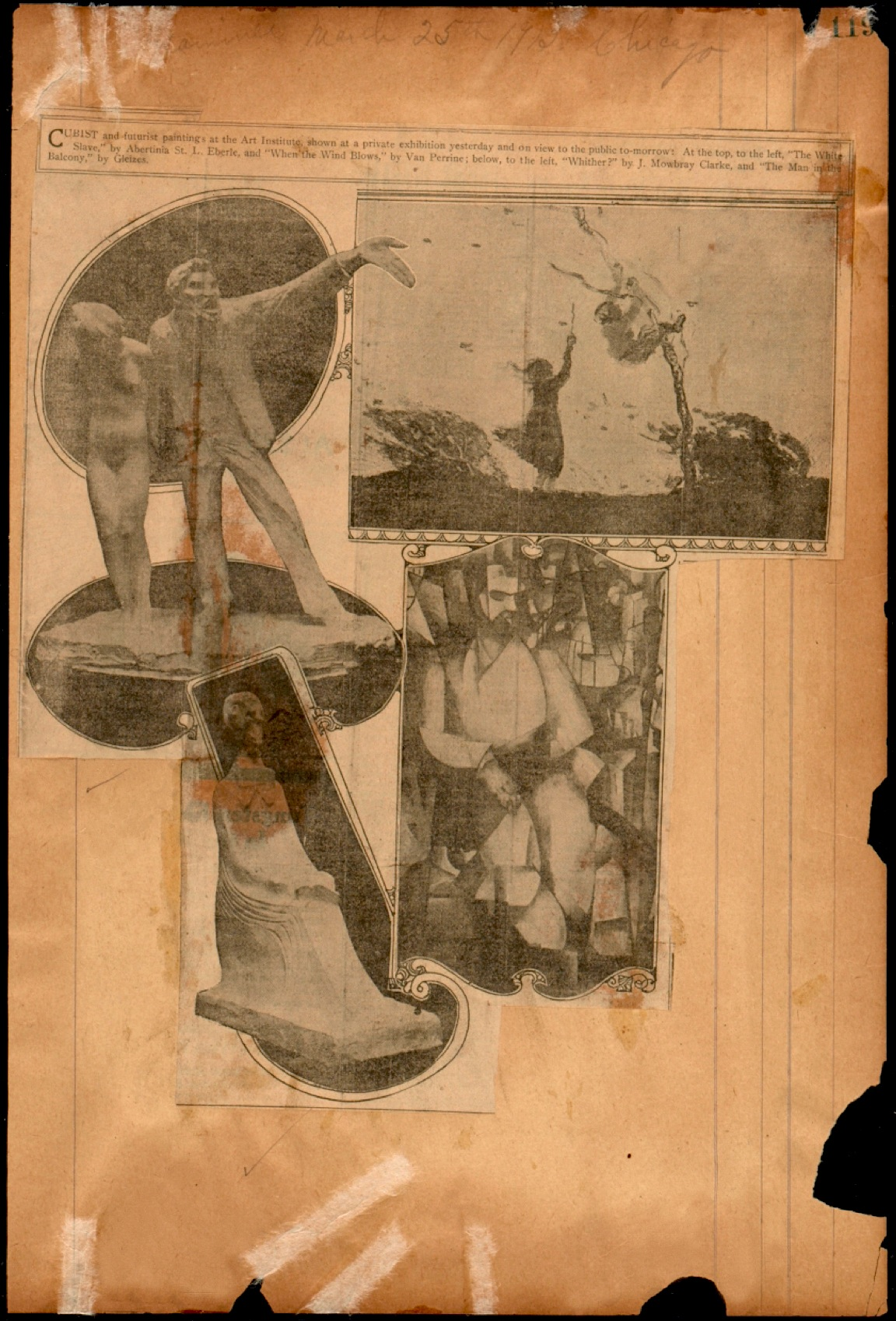
Albert Gleizes, Man on a Balcony, Walt Kuhn scrapbook of press clippings documenting the Armory Show, vol. 2, 1913, page 123

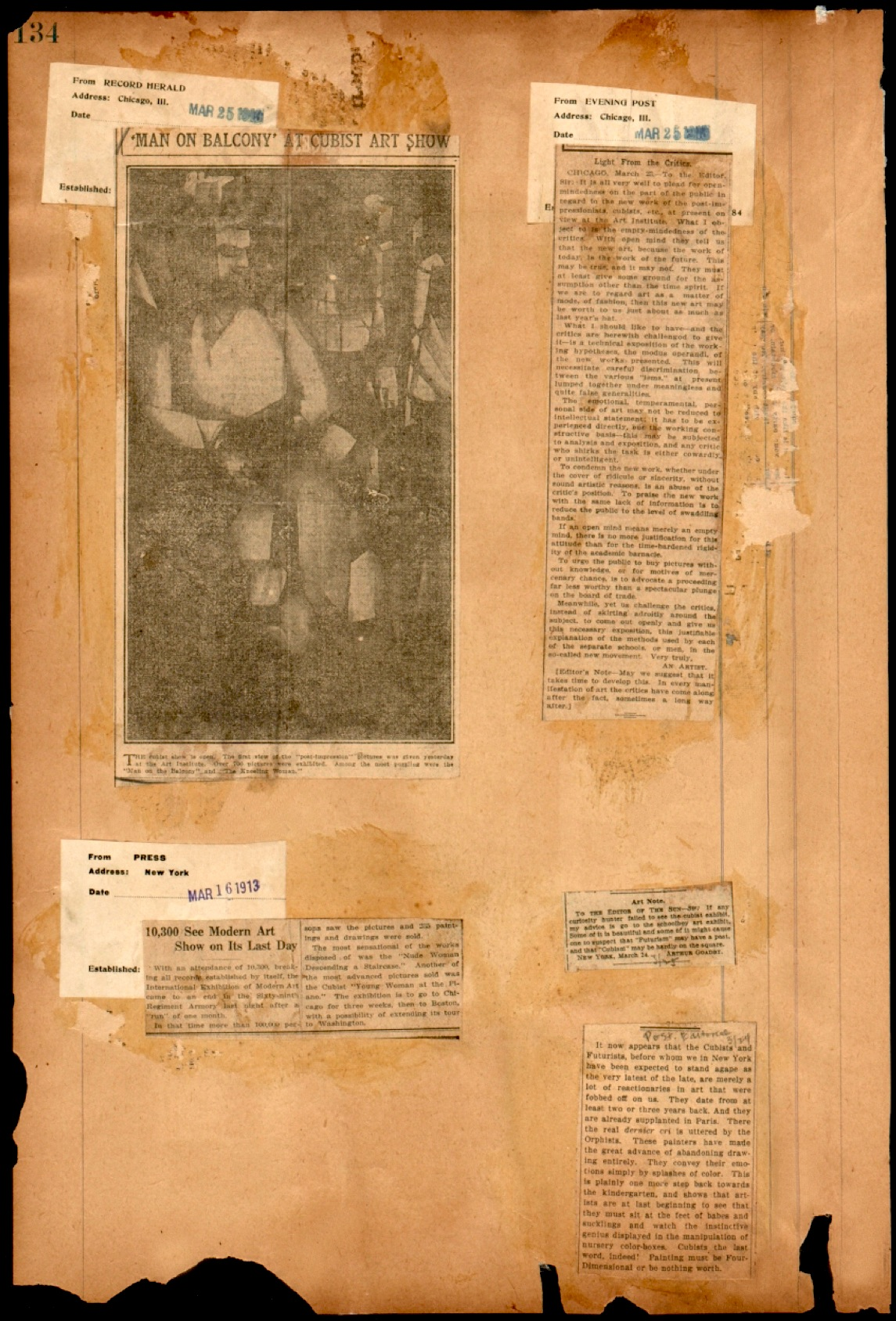
Albert Gleizes, Man on a Balcony, Walt Kuhn scrapbook of press clippings documenting the Armory Show, vol. 2, 1913, page 123

This exhibition also featured La Maison cubiste. Raymond Duchamp-Villon designed facade of a 10 meter by 3 meter house, which included a hall, a living room and a bedroom. This installation was placed in the Art Décoratif section of the Salon d'Automne. The major contributors were André Mare, a decorative designer, Roger de La Fresnaye, Jacques Villon and Marie Laurencin. In the house were hung cubist paintings by Marcel Duchamp, Albert Gleizes, Fernand Léger, Roger de La Fresnaye, and Jean Metzinger (Woman with a Fan, 1912). Though in the Deco section of the Parisian salon, the installation would soon find its way into the Cubist room at the 1913 Armory Show in New York City.

== Armory Show ==
The International Exhibition of Modern Art, known today as the Armory Show, was a landmark event in the history of art. This monumental series of exhibitions showcased the works of the most radical European artists of the time alongside those of their progressive American contemporaries. This massive exhibition was presented in varying forms at three venues—New York (69th Regiment Armory, February 17–March 15), Chicago (Art Institute of Chicago, March 24–April 16), and Boston (Copley Society, April 23–May 14). The exhibition introduced the visual language of European modernism to a wide spectrum of the American public, changing the aesthetic outlook for American artists, collectors, critics, galleries and museums.

In 1913, Archipenko, Gleizes, Picabia, Picasso, the Duchamp brothers and others introduced Cubism to an American audience at the Armory Show in three major cities, New York City, Chicago and Boston. In addition to Man on a balcony (no. 196), Gleizes exhibited his 1910 painting (no. 195 of the catalogue) Femme aux Phlox (Museum of Fine Arts, Houston), an example of early Cubism.

== See also ==
- List of works by Albert Gleizes

== Literature ==
- Guillaume Apollinaire, Les Peintres Cubistes, Méditations Esthétiques, Eugène Figuière Éditeurs, 1913
- Jerome Eddy, Cubists and Post-Impressionism, A.C. McClurg & Co., Chicago, 1914
- Willard Huntington Wright, Modern painting, its tendency and meaning, 3 editions, first published in 1915
- Bulletin, Art Institute of Chicago, 1922
- Ozenfant and jeanneret, La Peinture Moderne, Paris, 1924
- Albert Gleizes, 'L'Epopée', Le Rouge et le Noir, 1929
- Frank Jewett Mather, Modern Painting: A Study of Tendencies, 1931
- René Édouard-Joseph, Dictionnaire biographique des artistes contemporains, 1910-1930, Published 1931
- Arts Magazine, Volume 7, Art Digest Incorporated, 1932
- Quarterly, Art Institute of Chicago, 1933
- Charles Terrasse, André Gloeckner and Eveline Byam Shaw, La Peinture Française au XXe siècle (French Painting in the Twentieth Century), 1939
- Bulletin of the Art Institute of Chicago, 1948
- 20th Century Art, from the Louise and Walter Arensberg Collection, The Art Institute of Chicago, October 20 to December 18, 1949
- André Lhote, Figure painting, 1953
- Philadelphia Museum or Art, Arensberg Catalogue, 1954
- Madeleine Vincent, La peinture des XIXe et XXe siècles, 1956
- François Fosca, Bilan du cubisme, 1956
- Frank Trapp, The 1913 Armory Show in Retrospect, 1958
- Guy Habasque, Cubism: Biographical and Critical Study, 1959
- José Pierre, Le Futurisme Et Le Dadaïsme, 1966
- José Pierre, Cubism, 1969
- Albert Gleizes, Puissances Du Cubisme, 1969 (Collection of articles published between 1925 and 1946)
- Daniel Robbins, Albert Gleizes, 1881-1953: A Retrospective Exhibition Solomon R. Guggenheim Museum, 1964
- Calvin Tomkins, The world of Marcel Duchamp, 1887-, Time-Life Books, 1966
- Douglas Cooper, The Cubist epoch, 1971
- George Heard Hamilton, Painting and sculpture in Europe, 1880-1940, 1972
- Richard H. Axsom, "Parade", Cubism as theater, 1974
- John Malcolm Nash, Cubism, Futurism and Constructivism, 1974
- Carl Zigrosser, A world of art and museums, Albert Gleizes, L'Homme au Balcon (sturdy crusader), 1975
- Angelica Zander Rudenstine, The Guggenheim Museum collection: paintings, 1880-1945, 1976
- Philip Alan Cecchettini, Don Whittemore, Art America: A Resource Manual, 1977
- Patricia E. Kaplan, Susan Manso, Major European art movements, 1900-1945: a critical anthology, 1977
- Edward F. Fry, Cubism, 1978
- Revue de l'art, Issues 43-46, Flammarion, 1979
- Anne D'Harnoncourt, Germano Celant, Futurism and the international avant-garde, Philadelphia Museum of Art, 1980
- Cahiers du Musée national d'art moderne, 1981
- Pierre Alibert, Albert Gleizes, Naissance Et Avenir Du Cubisme, 1982
- Milton A. Cohen, E.E. Cummings paintings: the hidden career, 1982
- Pierre Cabanne, Le cubisme, 1982
- L'art sacré d'Albert Gleizes: 22 mai-31 août 1985, Musée des beaux-arts, Caen, 1985
- Dewey F. Mosby, Vivian Endicott Barnett, Abstraction, Non-objectivity, Realism: Twentieth-century Painting, Solomon R. Guggenheim Museum, 1987
- Milton A. Cohen, Poet and painter: the aesthetics of E.E. Cummings's early work, 1987
- John Golding, Cubism: A History and an Analysis, 1907-1914, 1959, 1988
- Milton Wolf Brown, The Story of the Armory Show, 1988
- Pierre Alibert, Gleizes: biographie, 1990
- Adele Heller, Lois Palken Rudnick, 1915, the cultural moment: the new politics, the new woman, the new psychology, the new art & the new theatre in America, 1991
- Jean Jacques Lévêque, Les années de la Belle Époque: 1890-1914, 1991
- Guillaume Apollinaire, Michel Décaudin, Pierre Caizergues, 1991
- George Heard Hamilton, Painting and Sculpture in Europe: 1880-1940, 1993
- Abraham A. Davidson, Early American modernist painting, 1910-1935, 1994
- Bruce Altshuler, The avant-garde in exhibition: new art in the 20th century, 1994
- Philadelphia Museum of Art, Paintings from Europe and the Americas in the Philadelphia Museum of Art: a concise catalogue, 1994
- Francis M. Naumann, New York Dada, 1915-23, 1994
- Helen Topliss, Modernism and Feminism: Australian Women Artists, 1900-1940, 1996
- Dietrich Schubert, Kunstmuseum Winterthur, Dieter Schwarz, Lehmbruck, Brâncuși, Léger, Bonnard, Klee, Fontana, Morandi..., 1997
- Anne Varichon, Daniel Robbins, Albert Gleizes: catalogue raisonné, 1998
- Diego Rivera, Juan Coronel Rivera, Luis-Martín Lozano, Diego Rivera: Art & Revolution, 1999
- Emmanuel Bénézit, Jacques Busse, Dictionnaire des peintres, sculpteurs, dessinateurs et graveurs, 1999
- Ann Temkin, Susan Rosenberg, Twentieth Century painting and sculpture in the Philadelphia Museum of Art, 2000
- Pierre Daix, Pour une histoire culturelle de l'art moderne: De David à Cézanne, 2000
- Allan Antliff, Anarchist Modernism: Art, Politics, and the First American Avant-Garde, 2001
- Martin Klepper, Joseph C. Schöpp, Transatlantic Modernism, 2001
- Guillaume Apollinaire, LeRoy C. Breunig, Apollinaire on art: essays and reviews, 1902-1918, 2001
- Peter Brooke, Albert Gleizes: For and Against the Twentieth Century, 2001
- Русский авангард: проблемы репрезентации и интерпретации И. Н. Карасик, Йосеф Киблицкий, Государственный русский музей (Саинт Петерсбург, Руссиа), 2001 [Russian Avant-garde: The Problem of Representation and Interpretation, I. Karasik, Joseph Kiblitsky, State Russian Museum, Saint Petersbourg, 2001]
- David Cottington, Cubism and Its Histories, 2004
- Laura Mattioli Rossi, Boccioni's materia: a futurist masterpiece and the avant-garde in Milan and Paris, Solomon R. Guggenheim Museum, New York, February 6 - May 9, 2004, Volume 3
- Anisabelle Berès, Galerie Berès, Au temps des cubistes: 1910-1920, 2006
- Gregory Galligan, The Cube in the Kaleidoscope: The American Reception of French Cubism, 1918 –1938, 2007
- Mark Antliff, Patricia Dee Leighten, A cubism reader: documents and criticism, 1906-1914, 2008
- Khédija Laouani, Manuel d'histoire de la peinture: du classicisme aux mouvements..., 2008
- Françoise Levaillant, Dario Gamboni, Jean-Roch Bouiller, Les bibliothèques d'artistes: XXe-XXIe siècles, 2010
- Nancy Hopkins Reily, Georgia O'Keeffe, A Private Friendship, Part I: Walking the Sun Prairie Land, 2011
