= Soyez amoureuses vous serez heureuses =

1889 art piece by Paul Gauguin

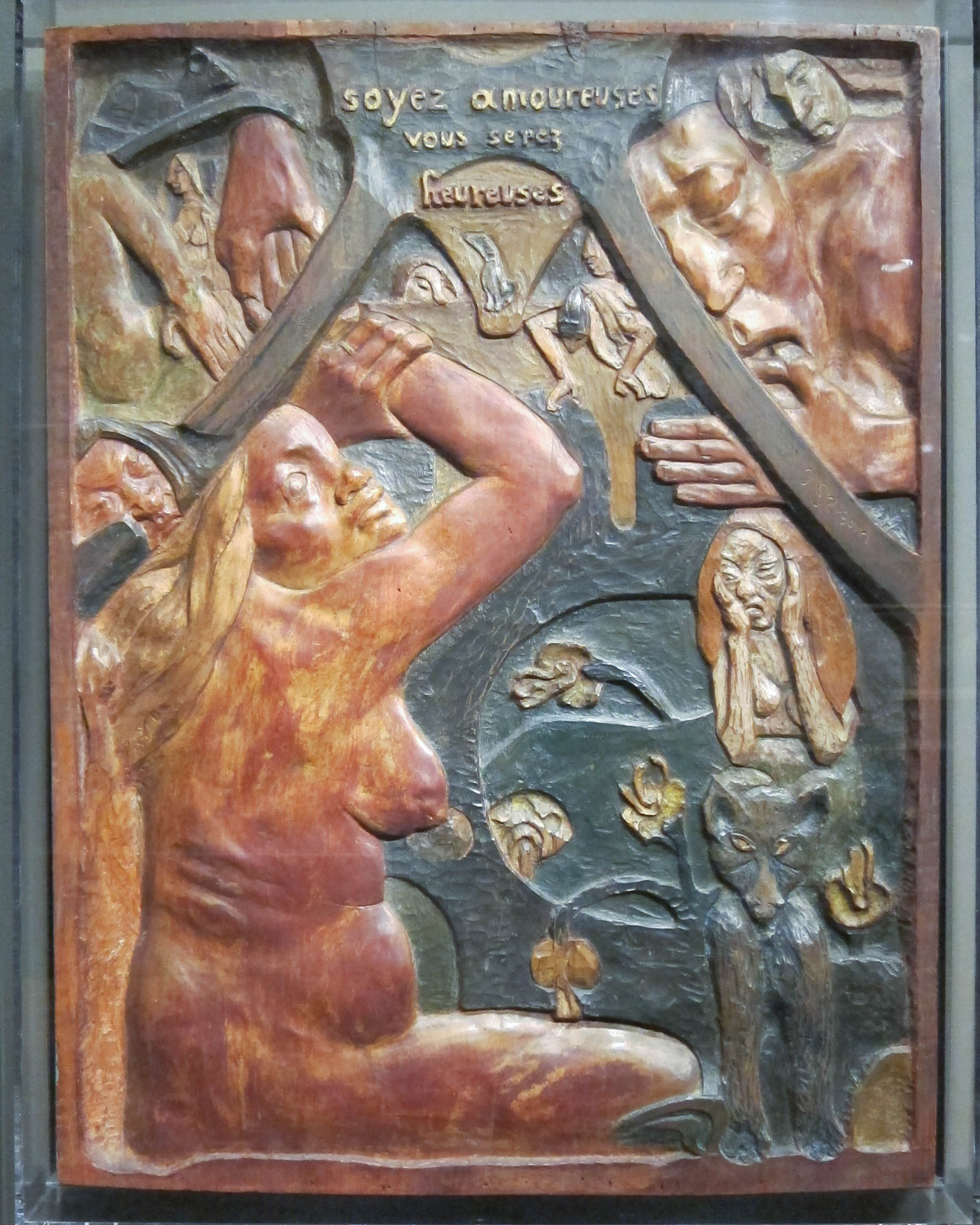
Soyez amoureuses vous serez heureuses, 1889, carved and polychromed wood. 95 x 72 x 6.4 cm. Museum of Fine Arts, Boston

Soyez amoureuses vous serez heureuses (Be In Love and You Will Be Happy) is a bas-relief wood panel carved and polychromed by French artist Paul Gauguin in the autumn of 1889. Gauguin depicts himself in the upper right, sucking his thumb and grasping the hand of the fleshy nude woman, a Polynesian or African, who seems to recoil in fear.

It is considered as among his most successful reliefs, but when first exhibited in 1891 at the Salon des XX in Brussels it was panned by hostile critics. It was exhibited again in 1906 during a major Gauguin retrospective; that exhibition led to a reappraisal of his wood carvings, which became major influences on artists such as Matisse, the Fauves, Brancusi, and Picasso. Soyez amoureuses vous serez heureuses is one of three similarly themed artworks that Gauguin prepared in 1889 for the Salon; the other two, possibly pendants to this panel, are the paintings In the Waves and Life and Death. The latter shows a white Eve and dark-skinned mummy against an ominous dark background.

== Themes ==
Gauguin was a pleasure seeker and found European morals constraining; his relocation to Polynesia seemingly released him from all that, but brought deep feelings of guilt and exploitation. He was free of Christian norms and boundaries and felt closer to nature. The title is somewhat ironic and probably stems from the same dark, bitter humour that led him to title his home the "House of Pleasure". In fact the work's subject matter is bleak and its mood turbulent. It represents an exploration of corruption, lust, voyeurism and male sexual power.

Art critic Albert Aurier in 1891 questioned the meaning of the work, in which "all lasciviousness, all the struggles of mind and flesh, and all the pain of sensual delight seem to writhe and gnash their teeth". The work is a reflection of later 19th century colonial guilt, which the artist conflates with his own, probably deserved, feelings of sexual guilt and decadence.

Gauguin includes a rather infantile self-portrait, a number of female nudes, and various flowers. A fox sits on the lower right, gazing out at the viewer, to whom he appears to be hostile, as if "guarding the scene of seduction". Gauguin had employed the symbolism of the fox in earlier works, and it is commonly assumed that he is invoking the fox as the symbol of perversity it represents in Indian culture.

== Variants ==
A number of other works by Gauguin have the same title phrase, always printed within the picture space. There is an 1894 watercolor, an 1898 woodcut, another bas-relief completed between 1901 and 1902, and a number of sketches.

Gauguin conceived his 1890 relief Soyez mystérieuses ("Be mysterious") as a companion piece. It is calmer and more harmonious than Soyez amoureuses. Comparing the two panels, Aurier asked, "how are we to describe this other carving ... which by contrast celebrates the pure joys of esotericism? Are they disturbing symbols of mystery, or fantastic shadows in the forests of enigma?"

== Provenance ==
Vincent van Gogh described the relief in a letter to his brother Theo, mentioning that Gauguin had spent a number of months working on it. It had been sent to Theo in Paris, who claimed that "Vincent would love it."

The work was acquired by the Galerie Goupil (Boussod et Valadon) of Paris in 1889, where it remained until 1893. It passed into the private collection of Émile Schuffenecker that year, and remained in the possession of the Schuffenecker family until 1949. It was included in the posthumous auction of the estate of Margaret Thompson Biddle in 1957.

== Sources ==
- Perloff, Nancy (1995). "Gauguin's French Baggage: Decadence and Colonialism in Tahiti." In Elazar Barkan and Ronald Bush, eds. Prehistories of the Future: The Primitivist Project and the Culture of Modernism. Stanford University Press. ISBN 9780804724869
