= Maurice Asselin =

French painter and engraver (1882–1947)

Maurice Paul Jean Asselin
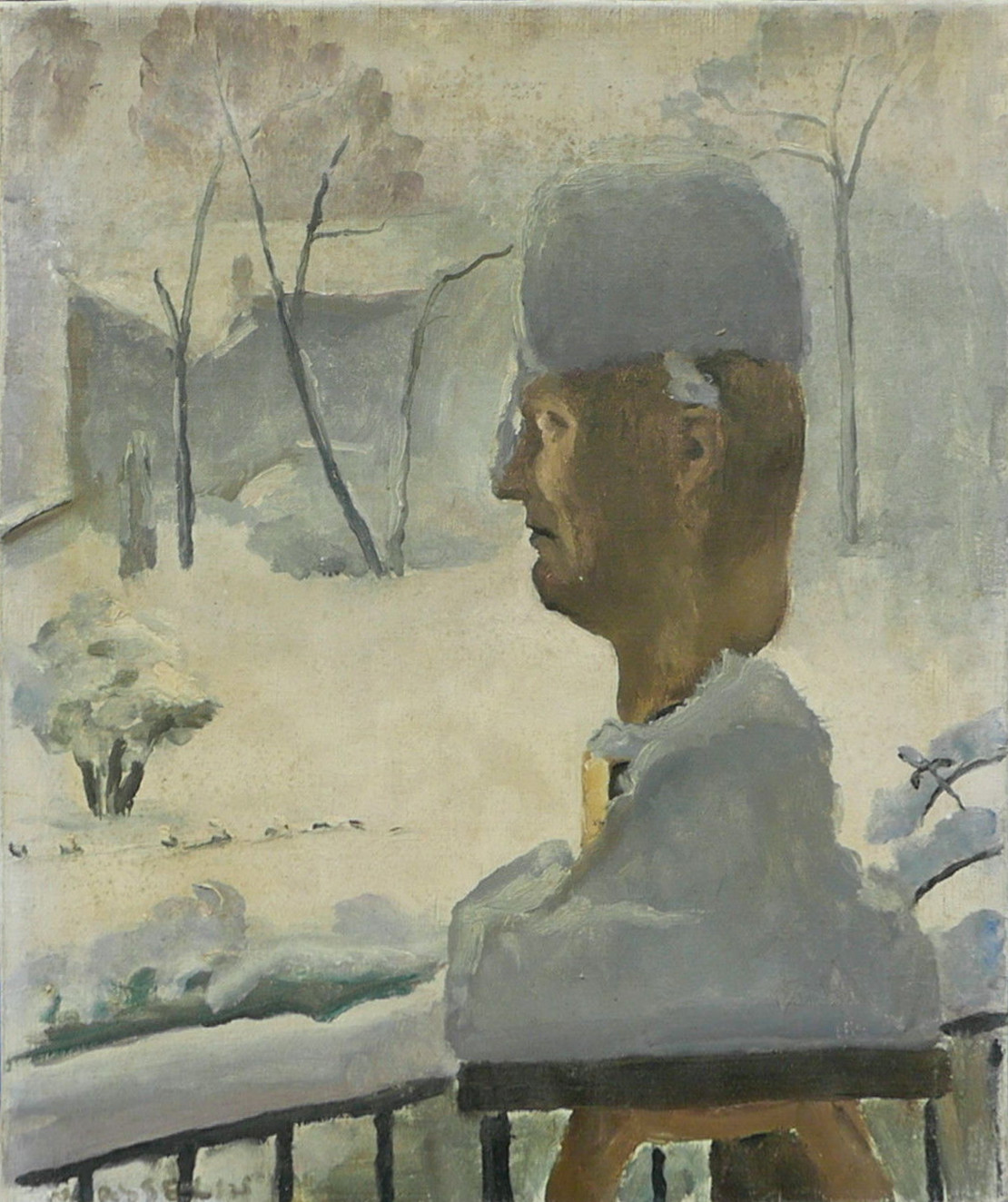
- Maurice Asselin, Self-portrait, under snow in Neuilly
- Born: 24 June 1882; Orléans, France
- Died: 27 September 1947 (aged 65); Neuilly-sur-Seine, France
- Education: École nationale supérieure des Beaux-Arts, Paris
- Known for: Painting, engraving
- Movement: School of Paris
- Spouse: Paton
- Children: Bernard, Jean, Georges
- Awards: Officier de la Légion d'honneur

Maurice Paul Jean Asselin (24 June 1882 – 27 September 1947) was a French painter, watercolourist, printmaker, lithographer, engraver and illustrator, associated with the School of Paris. He is best known for still lifes and nudes. Other recurring themes in his work are motherhood, and the landscapes and seascapes of Brittany. He also worked as a book illustrator, particularly in the 1920s. His personal style was characterised by subdued colours, sensitive brushwork and a strong sense of composition and design.

He was awarded the rank of Officier de la Légion d'honneur in 1939.

== Biography ==
=== Early life ===
Maurice Asselin was born on 24 June 1882 in Orléans. His father was a coachman, and his mother ran the tobacco shop La Pipe d'or at the corner of rue Sainte-Catherine and rue Jeanne-d'Arc, before they took over a restaurant called L'Auberge de la rue Sainte-Catherine. After studying design and painting at the Collège Sainte-Croix in Orléans, which ended in his graduating second class, in 1899 he began as an apprentice working with calico in the fabric house Aux Travailleurs at place de la République in Orléans, and then in 1900 in a textile house in the Sentier district of Paris. Described as a half-hearted and "distracted employee", he returned to spend the years 1901–1903 in Orléans, his father having died in 1902. In his sketchbook, from which he was never separated from childhood, he captured views of Orléans, Tigy, Saint-Hilaire-Saint-Mesmin, before returning to Paris where he was a student of Fernand Cormon at the École nationale supérieure des Beaux-Arts (National School of Fine Arts). The academic teaching, which he disliked, was compensated by in-depth observation of Paul Cézanne and the Impressionists at the Musée du Luxembourg and the Louvre. This was interrupted by the onset of tuberculosis, which he probably acquired in the badly heated rooms he occupied in the attics of the 15th arrondissement, leading to his hospitalisation in an Auvergne sanatorium.

=== Brittany, Italy, first exhibitions ===
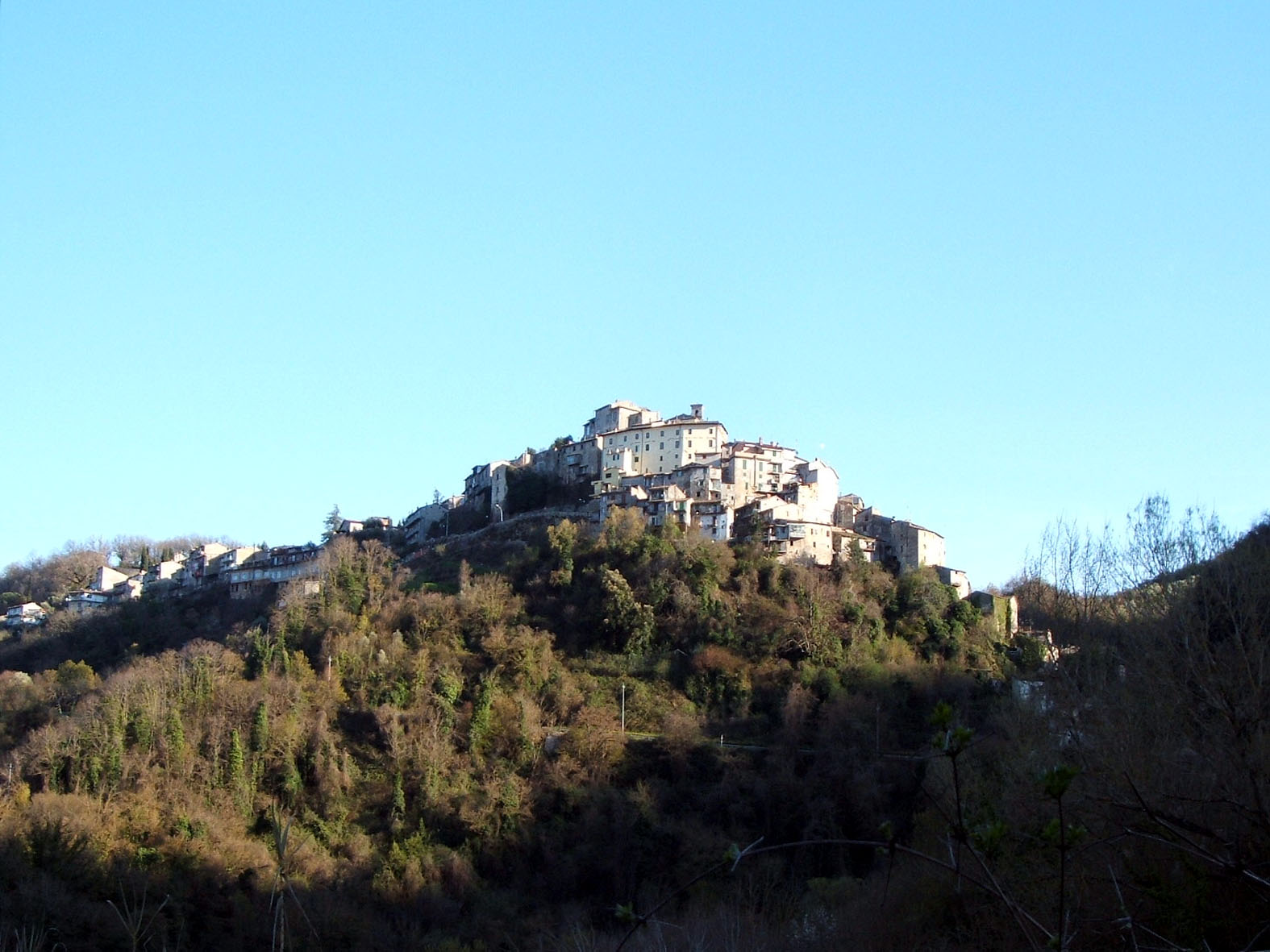
The Italian village of Anticoli Corrado, which Maurice Asselin loved.

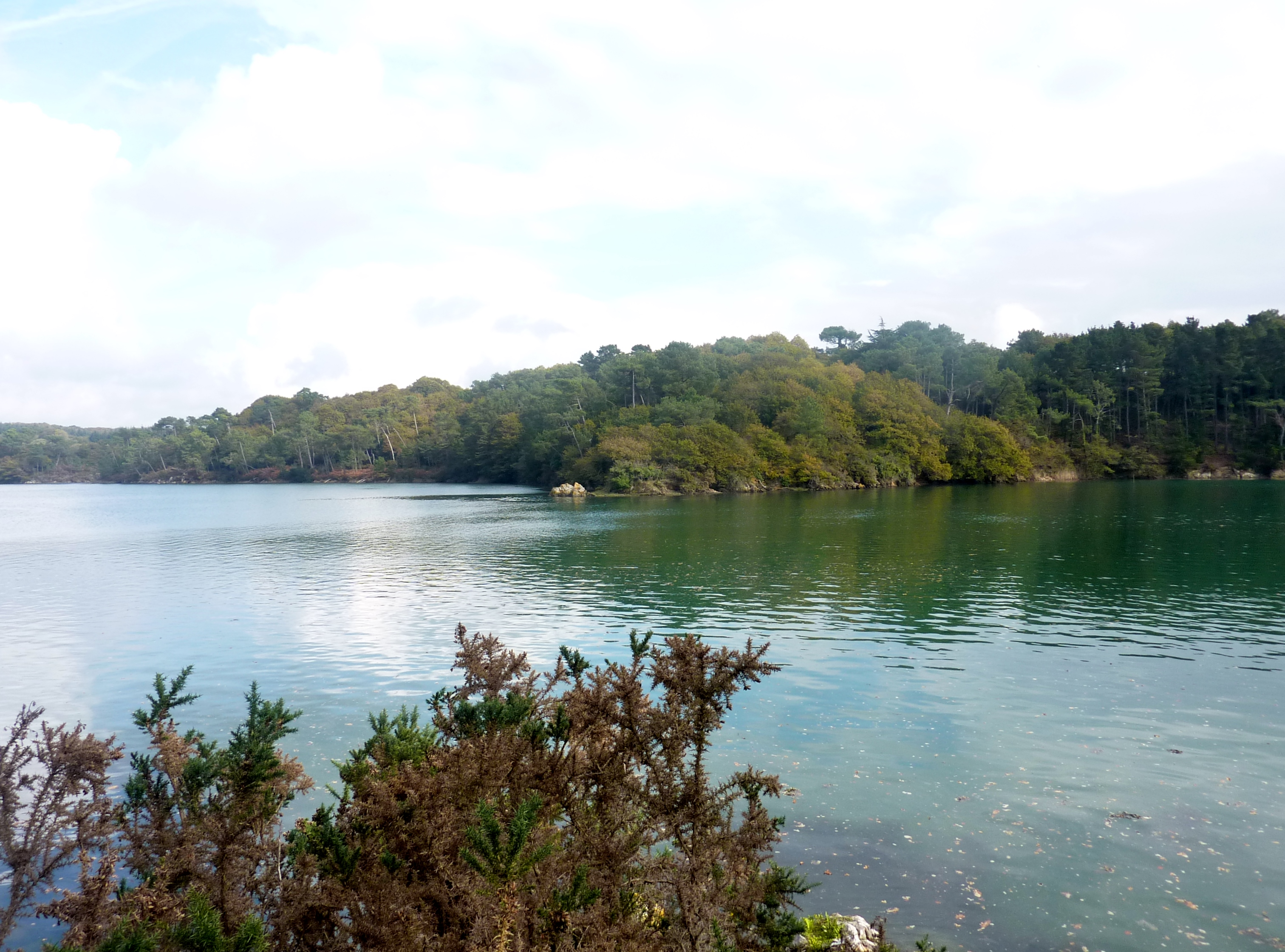
A Brittany landscape, between Moëlan-sur-Mer and Riec-sur-Bélon.

Maurice Asselin first visited Brittany in 1905, where he met the painter Jacques Vaillant (Note: Jacques Vaillant (1879–1934), painter.) at Moëlan-sur-Mer. He returned there in 1906 and 1907. After his first showings at Parisian exhibitions (the Salon des indépendants in 1906, and the Salon d'automne in 1907, of which he became a member and member of the jury in 1910), he left for Italy where, from May to October 1908, he bicycled from Rome to Florence, spending time in Anticoli Corrado, Assisi, and Siena. Asselin returned to Italy in 1910 where from Genoa he went to Naples, spent time in Rome, and finally rented a small studio in Anticoli Corrado throughout the summer, where his first works were completed on the theme of the nude.

Asselin first met the writer Pierre Mac Orlan in 1910 in Moëlan-sur-Mer, and this was followed by a long friendship. Mac Orlan wrote in his memoirs of the summer activities of Maurice Asselin and his painter friends Ricardo Florès, (Note: Ricardo Florès (1878–1918), painter, illustrator, caricaturist and cartoonist.) Émile Jourdan and Jacques Vaillant in Brigneau-en-Moëlan at La mère Bacon, "a small fishing inn perched on a rock, located at the entrance to the jetty, which it overlooked". "Maurice Asselin brings delicate watercolours back from Concarneau every summer," confirmed another friend of the artist, the novelist Roland Dorgelès.

Returning to Paris, Asselin lived from 1911 at 39, rue Lamarck. Asselin, Mac Orlan, Roland Dorgelès and many other residents of Montmartre including Francis Carco and Maurice Sauvayre (Note: Maurice Sauvayre (1889–1986), painter, engraver, illustrator and cartoonist.) enjoyed colourful Sunday outings to the Auberge de l'Œuf dur et du Commerce in Saint-Cyr-sur-Morin.

On 31 July 1914, back in the south of France in Finistère, Asselin, Vaillant and Mac Orlan heard of France's entry into the First World War, heralded by the tocsin bell.

=== England ===
In 1912 the art critic André Salmon described Maurice Asselin as "one of the young painters most likely to succeed." That year also saw the first of the artist's many trips to London, with his first solo exhibition being held there in February 1913. Between 1914 and 1916 he was Walter Sickert’s closest friend, for a time sharing the latter's apartment in Red Lion Square. In the monthly column that Sickert wrote in The Burlington Magazine at the time, in December 1915 he made a comparative study of the paintings of Asselin and Roger Fry, which concluded Asselin's superiority. Each of the two artists painted the portrait of the other; the portrait of Asselin painted in 1915 by Sickert is now in the collections of the Potteries Museum & Art Gallery in Stoke-on-Trent, while Asselin kept his "Portrait of Walter Sickert" at his home in Montmartre and later in Neuilly-sur-Seine. Asselin also spent time in 1915 in Ashford with another painter friend, Ludovic-Rodo Pissarro. (Note: Ludovic-Rodo Pissarro (1878–1952), painter and engraver.) On his return to Paris, he lived from 1916 at 121, rue de Caulaincourt in the 18th arrondissement.

=== Artists’ Missions to the Armies ===
At the instigation of General Niox, director of the Musée de l’Armée in Paris, a decree of 8 November 1916 declared that "the Under-Secretary of State for Fine Arts, with the authorisation of the Minister of War, may entrust to artists assignments with the armies". A committee which included art historian and curator Léonce Bénédite, and art critics François Thiébault-Sisson (Note: François Thiébault-Sisson (1856–1936, art critic.) and Arsène Alexandre was put in charge of selecting artists not mobilised, stipulating that their purpose was "the painting of real history", rather than idealistic, symbolic or patriotic imagery. The "modern" painters thus selected, exhibitors at the Salon d'automne and the Salon des indépendants, ranged from the former nabis (Pierre Bonnard, Édouard Vuillard, Félix Vallotton, Maurice Denis) to the "new post-Cézanne landscape painters" who at the time included Maurice Asselin, Louis Charlot, (Note: Louis Charlot (1878–1951), painter.) Henri Lebasque, Henri Ottmann, Gaston Prunier, (Note: Gaston Prunier (1863–1927), painter and engraver.) and Jules-Émile Zingg, and were commissioned in this way to document history which was not yet written. The presence of Asselin's work in the collections of the Musée de l’Armée shows his commitment to the "Artists’ Missions to the Armies in 1917".

=== After the First World War ===
Maurice Asselin married Paton on 17 September 1919, a marriage which produced three sons, Bernard in 1922, Jean in 1923 and Georges in 1925, and introduced the theme of motherhood into his work. He returned to Brittany in the 1920s and found Pierre Mac Orlan, Jacques Vaillant and Pierre-Eugène Clairin (Note: Pierre-Eugène Clairin (1897–1980), painter, engraver, illustrator and resistance fighter.) there, with the group taking up residence at the Hôtel de la Poste run by the wife of the painter Ernest Correlleau (Note: Ernest Correlleau (1892–1936), painter.) in Pont-Aven. In 1925, in the company of the painter André Fraye, (Note: André Fraye (1889–1963), painter, illustrator and engraver.) he travelled along the Mediterranean coast (Marseille, Sainte-Maxime, Saint-Tropez), in the Var (Le Luc) and in the Vaucluse (Avignon, Orange). That same year, Asselin left Montmartre to settle at 45–47, rue du Bois-de-Boulogne in Neuilly-sur-Seine, in the residence-workshop whose design and construction he entrusted to the architect and designer Pierre Patout.

Asselin returned to southern France in 1927 with Paton and their three sons. In the 1930s (his mother died in Orléans in 1932) saw him again in Brittany: Concarneau in 1930, Douarnenez in 1931, Beuzec-Conq in 1932, Pont-Aven until 1938, Kerdruc in 1939, all in an entourage made up of painters Pierre-Eugène Clairin, Émile Compard, (Note: Émile Compard (1900–1977), painter and sculptor.) Ernest Correleau, Fernand Dauchot, Émile Jourdan, Jean Puy, René Thomsen, (Note: René Thomsen (1897–1976), painter and engraver.) and with literary friends too: Pierre Mac Orlan, always, but also Max Jacob or Liam O'Flaherty whose portrait Asselin painted. The exoduses of the Second World War led Asselin and his family to Chalonnes-sur-Loire until the armistice of 22 June 1940 between France and Nazi Germany. Both psychological suffering (Asselin resented defeat and the Occupation) and physical pain (osteoarthritis in his hip made walking difficult) are felt in his painting, a period of "red nudes" and small bunches of flowers. "His palette is hardening" noted his son Georges Asselin.

=== Death ===
In 1945, he went to Brittany to stay with the Correleaus at the Hôtel de la Poste in Pont-Aven, for the last time. He was admitted to Saint-Antoine Hospital in Paris in 1947, was operated on by Professor Bergeret on Monday 22 September and died on Saturday 27 September.

=== Distinctions ===
- Officer of the Legion of Honour
- Member of the Académie des gastronomes, founder: Curnonsky

=== Posterity: “the realist reaction” ===
Art historian and critic Bernard Dorival (Note: Bernard Dorival (1914–2003), art historian and critic.) described Maurice Asselin, along with Edmond Ceria, (Note: Edmond Ceria (1884–1955), painter and illustrator.) André Dunoyer de Segonzac, Charles Dufresne, Paul-Élie Gernez, (Note: Paul-Élie Gernez (1888–1948), painter, engraver and illustrator.) Louise Hervieu, Maurice Loutreuil (Note: Maurice Loutreuil (1885–1925), painter.) and Henry de Waroquier (Note: Henry de Waroquier (1881–1970), painter, sculptor, draughtsman and engraver.) as painters of the "realist reaction" who "prefer the frank realism of the Impressionists and the sincerity with which they questioned nature" to "the idealism and to the photographic realism" of the academic tradition of the 19th century." “Against the unrealism of the Cubists, they pose as heirs to the independent masters of the third quarter of the 19th century, primarily Gustave Courbet, the spiritual father of their movement". Dorival supported his argument by quoting Asselin: "if you really love painting, you will not only ask it to be a decoration for the walls of your home, but first of all to be food for your interior life.” Asselin continued: “no cerebral combination, no theory can give birth to a work of art… Art springs from the amazed love of life.”

== Quotes ==
=== Sayings of Maurice Asselin ===
“A beautiful work must, by its arrangement, its rhythm, the choice of the elements which compose it, satisfy the refined man, and, by the impression of life which it releases, move the simplest man." – Maurice Asselin

=== Critical reception ===
- "It is marvellous to see all that Asselin can enclose in a few charcoal lines enhanced with watercolour. Rather than the tones of nature, it expresses the nuances of light; and it is extremely delicate, without ever falling into blandness." – François Fosca (Note: François Fosca (1881–1980), novelist, essayist and art critic.)
- "Sober painting, a little cold, solid, with geometrically constructed undersides... In truth, it is deliberately proletarian, but the sincerity of the artist bursts, curls, shines through with each touch. With Maurice Asselin, no rich, opulent, bourgeois interiors, filled with tinsel, but studios for poets, actors, artists, rooms for workers, modest, simple, with a somewhat crude decor, flowers beautiful and fresh, shown on rough tables. The painter presents us with portraits of a perfect likeness, and his preference is for writers, poets, artists whom he surprises in their private moments... Jules Romains meditates on his balcony, perhaps forging some enthusiastic unanimist poem. Behind him the city, with its tumble of red and blue roofs, its red chimneys, blazes under the sun. Asselin has achieved one of his happiest contrasts. Paul Bour, (Note: Paul Bour (1884–1959), draughtsman and caricaturist.) lying in a rocking chair, reads a book. Émile Jourdan, a grey felt hat over his ear, seems a modern musketeer. His aquiline profile stands out, clean, clear, cursive, well worth it... Maurice Asselin loves the beauty of women's profiles. His well-drawn nudes offer themselves to our eyes without any frivolity. Their plasticity and tonality sometimes make one think of Félix Valloton; it is no mean homage that I pay to the artist in this way." – Georges Turpin (Note: Georges Turpin (1885–1952), writer and art critic.)
- "Maurice Asselin, who shows us peasant figures in their familiar setting, rises by a sustained effort to the purest tradition. In front of his serious, solid canvases, without false effect, one involuntarily thinks of the Le Nain brothers, even though the colour of the modern painter is more lively and more flowery." – Jean Mériem
- "With Asselin, intimacy has a narrower meaning than with Georges d'Espagnat. (Note: Georges d'Espagnat .(1870–1950), painter, illustrator and engraver.) It is the poetry of the family environment in which he lives. Raised in a calm provincial atmosphere, Asselin was perhaps inclined by atavism and education to this expression of domestic charm. Admittedly, he painted landscapes and still lifes, but most frequently what comes back in his work is the child, the woman engaged in domestic work, motherhood. Woman has for him this somewhat sad gravity which is very much in the French tradition and which makes one think of the Le Nain whose women have Asselin’s robustness. His nudes also have this hint of intimacy, of reserve, which is specific to the nude in French painting. With regard to his technique, very restrained in its effects, Asselin owes nothing to Fauvism, but a lot to Cézanne. Without finding in his painting all the processes of the master of Aix-en-Provence, as in the painting of Simon-Lévy (Note: Simon-Lévy, also known as Simon Levy (1886–1973), painter.) one cannot help thinking that it is the spirit of Cézanne which animates his paintings. whose passages of planes are so clearly delimited so as to perfectly highlight the luminous volumes." – Germain Bazin
- "Asselin always maintains the same sober note that gives his interior scenes their beautiful simplicity." – Raymond Cogniat
- "Nudes, flowers, landscapes, figures are painted in light with the sobriety, the solidity which gives strength to everything Asselin paints. But the bare side of his painting does not exclude its richness, in the light where, against a grey background, the plumage of a pheasant or the sumptuousness of a flower appear in all their magnificence, and it is an enchantment." – Le Figaro, "Courrier des arts" section, May 1937
- "For Asselin, sensitivity must be the very reason for art." – Gaston Diehl
- "I thank Maurice Asselin, painter of the spiritual light of men and things, because these already abolished landscapes, these characters who have become literary ghosts remain in the reality of these testimonies which together made our personality and our reason to exist honourably." – Pierre MacOrlan
- "A refined intimist, Maurice Asselin knew how to irradiate his characters with a subtle light, represented in the attitudes of everyday life, painted with a clear and delicate palette, supported by a light and precise line; they live a life that is both secret and natural. As for his watercolours, bathed in limpid light, with just the right amount of colour and white, they place Maurice Asselin among the best watercolourists of our time. – Pierre Imbourg
- "The subtlety of his half-tones suggest a dreamy universe." – René Huyghe et Jean Rudel
- "He remains one of the most gifted representatives of the realism that is proper to the School of Paris, which brought together all the previous disciplines. – Gérald Schurr
- "By remaining close to life he paints intimate, warm scenes, portraying members of his family, more particularly his wife, and his friends. He renders landscapes with emotion, especially when it comes to watercolours with rapid and luminous lines." – Alain Pizerra.

== Works ==
=== Works in books ===
- Carco, Francis (1923). Rien qu'une femme, 13 eaux-fortes de Maurice Asselin (Nothing but a Woman: 13 etchings by Maurice Asselin) (in French). Paris: Éditions Georges Crès.
- Frapier, Edmond (1924). Essai sur l'histoire de la lithographie en France – Les peintres lithographes de Manet à Matisse, portfolio de 16 lithographies dont Maternité de Maurice Asselin (Essay on the History of Lithography in France: Lithographic Painters from Manet to Matisse, with a portfolio of 16 lithographs including Motherhood by Maurice Asselin) (in French). Paris: Galerie des peintres-graveurs.
- Romains, Jules (1927). Mort de quelqu'un, 24 eaux-fortes de Maurice Asselin, 350 exemplaires numérotés (Somebody's Death: 24 Etchings by Maurice Asselin; 350 numbered copies) (in French). Éditions Georges Crès.
- Corbière, Tristan (1929). La Rapsode foraine et le Pardon de Sainte-Anne, lithographies de Maurice Asselin (in French). Paris: Éditions Georges Crès.
- Hirsch, Charles-Henry (1937). Ouvrage collectif, soixante deux lithographies par soixante deux artistes dont Maurice Asselin et Max Savin pour Belleville à vol d'âne de Charles-Henry Hirsch, cinq cents exemplaires numérotés (Collective work: Sixty-two Lithographs by Sixty-two Artists including Maurice Asselin and Max Savin for Belleville à vol d'âne; five hundred numbered copies) (in French). Paris: Imprimerie Daragnès for the City of Paris International Exposition of Art and Technology in Modern Life.
- Gros, Gabriel-Joseph (1945). Le bouquet de la mariée, 630 exemplaires, les 30 premiers enrichis de lithographies, pointes sèches ou eaux-fortes par Albert André, Maurice Asselin, Valdo Barbey, Michel Ciry, Jean-Joseph Crotti, Hermine David, Othon Friesz, Édouard Goerg, Edmond Heuzé, Marie Laurencin, André Marchand, Kostia Terechkovitch, Louis Touchagues, Louis Valtat (The Bride's Bouquet: 630 copies, the first 30 enriched with lithographs, drypoints or etchings by Albert André, Maurice Asselin, Valdo Barbey, Michel Ciry, Jean-Joseph Crotti, Hermine David, Othon Friesz, Édouard Goerg, Edmond Heuzé, Marie Laurencin, André Marchand, Kostia Terechkovitch, Louis Touchagues, Louis Valtat) (in French). Paris: Éditions Marcel Saultier.
- Maurice Asselin (préface de Gaston Diehl), dix estampes originales (Maurice Asselin: Ten Original Prints, with a preface by Gaston Diehl) (in French). Paris: Éditions Rombaldi. 1946.
- Yaki, Paul (1947). Montmartre, terre des artistes, illustrations de Maurice Asselin, Jean Aujame, René Collamarini et Max Jacob (Montmartre, land of artists, illustrations by Maurice Asselin, Jean Aujame, René Collamarini and Max Jacob) (in French). Paris: Éditions G. Girard.

=== Works in public collections ===
List is not exhaustive; in alphabetic order of location.

Algeria

- Algiers, National Museum of Fine Arts of Algiers: cabinet of prints and engravings

Belgium

- Ghent, Museum of Fine Arts

Denmark

- Copenhagen, National Gallery of Denmark, four paintings from the Rump collection

France

- Aix-les-Bains, Faure Museum Modèle nu au fauteuil (Nude model in chair)
- Albi, Musée Toulouse-Lautrec
  - Portrait of Édouard Branly, 1936
  - Femme nue debout (Nude woman standing)
- Bagnols-sur-Cèze, Musée Albert-André Rue de Tournon in Paris
- Brest, Musée des Beaux-Arts de Brest Le repos du modèle (Model at rest), oil on canvas, 72.8 x 59.8 cm
- Cambrai, Musée des Beaux-Arts de Cambrai: Le Café dans le jardin (Coffee in the Garden)
- Grenoble, Museum of Grenoble Portrait of Jean Pellerin in Keriolet, 1920
- Guéret, Museum of the Sénatorerie: Jeune femme au piano (Young Woman at the Piano), 1927
- Lyon, Museum of Fine Arts of Lyon
- Nanterre, The Contemporary: Mobilisation
- Nantes, Musée d'Arts de Nantes Maternité (Motherhood), 1923, oil on canvas
- Orléans, Musée des beaux-arts d'Orléans Nu allongé (Reclining nude), 1912
- Paris
  - Bibliothèque nationale de France Portraits of Maurice Farina
  - Ministry for Europe and Foreign Affairs (France) Concarneau Basin
  - Musée d'Art Moderne de Paris At the Glénans, about 1932–1935, watercolour
  - Musée National d'Art Moderne
    - Le Café dans le jardin (Coffee in the Garden), 1922
    - Checy, 1927
    - L'Arven de Rosbraz, 1938, watercolour
    - L'Arc de triomphe du Carrousel, 1938
- Péronne, Alfred Danicourt Museum
- Pont-Aven, Musée des Beaux-Arts de Pont-Aven
  - Self-portrait
  - La Jetée de Brigneau (The Pier of Brigneau)
- Rennes, Museum of Fine Arts of Rennes Vue de Île Raguenès (View of Île Raguenès), 1906, charcoal and watercolour
- Saint-Brieuc, town hall Curnonsky en Bretagne (Curnonsky in Brittany), loan from the National Foundation for Contemporary Art
- Versailles, Musée Lambinet Barques au port (Boats in port), watercolour
- Location unknown Curnonsky à la table de Mélanie Rouat (Curnonsky at Mélanie Rouat's Table), 1927, oil on canvas, formerly in Paris at the Musée du Luxembourg

Luxembourg

- National Museum of History and Art, Luxembourg City

Netherlands

- Amsterdam, Stedelijk Museum
- The Hague, Kunstmuseum Den Haag

New Zealand

- Christchurch, Christchurch Art Gallery Te Puna o Waiwhetu

Russia

- Moscow, Pushkin Museum

Switzerland

- Geneva, Petit Palais Museum
  - Les Péniches (The Barges), 1913, oil on canvas
  - Jeune femme se dénudant (Young Woman Undressing), about 1927, oil on canvas

United Kingdom

- Cambridge, University of Cambridge, Fitzwilliam Museum Bateaux (Boats)
- Cheltenham, The Wilson (Cheltenham) Deux jeunes filles lisant (Two Girls Reading), oil on canvas
- Leeds, Leeds City Museum
- London, British Museum
- Manchester Whitworth Art Gallery
- Wakefield, The Hepworth Wakefield Anemones, oil on canvas

United States

- Boston, Museum of Fine Arts
- Los Angeles, Los Angeles County Museum of Art
- New York City
  - Brooklyn Museum
  - Museum of Modern Art Maternité (Motherhood), lithograph

=== Works in private collections ===
- Former collection of Pierre Mac Orlan, location unknown
- Former collection of Marius Borgeaud, (Note: Marius Borgeaud (1861–1924), painter. He was another regular in Brittany, and also a neighbour of Maurice Asselin in rue Lamarck in Paris.) Portrait de Marius Borgeaud, location unknown
- Former collection of Georges Renand – Jeannine et Édouard Chapet, Berge de la Seine, aquarelle.

== Gallery ==
Works by Maurice Asselin

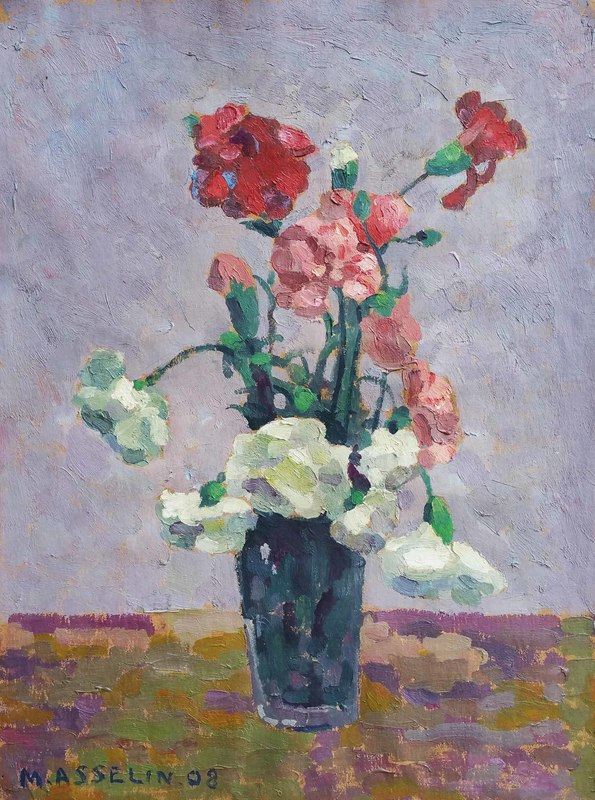
Bouquet d'œillets (Bouquet of Carnations) (1908)

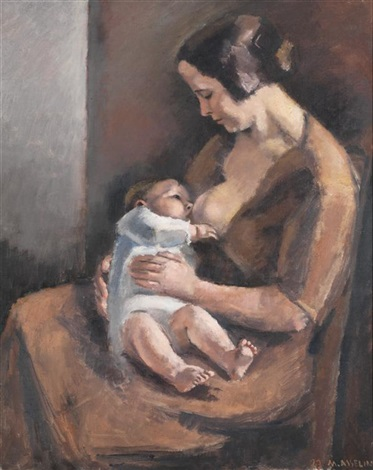
Maternité (Motherhood) (1923)

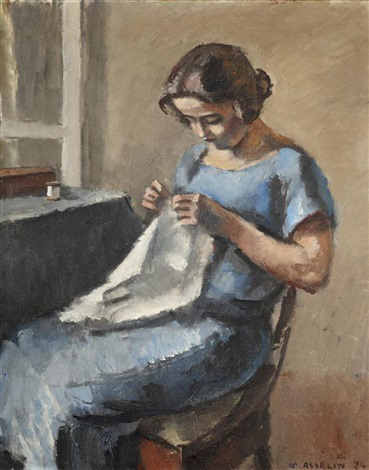
Femme à la couture (Woman Sewing) (1924)

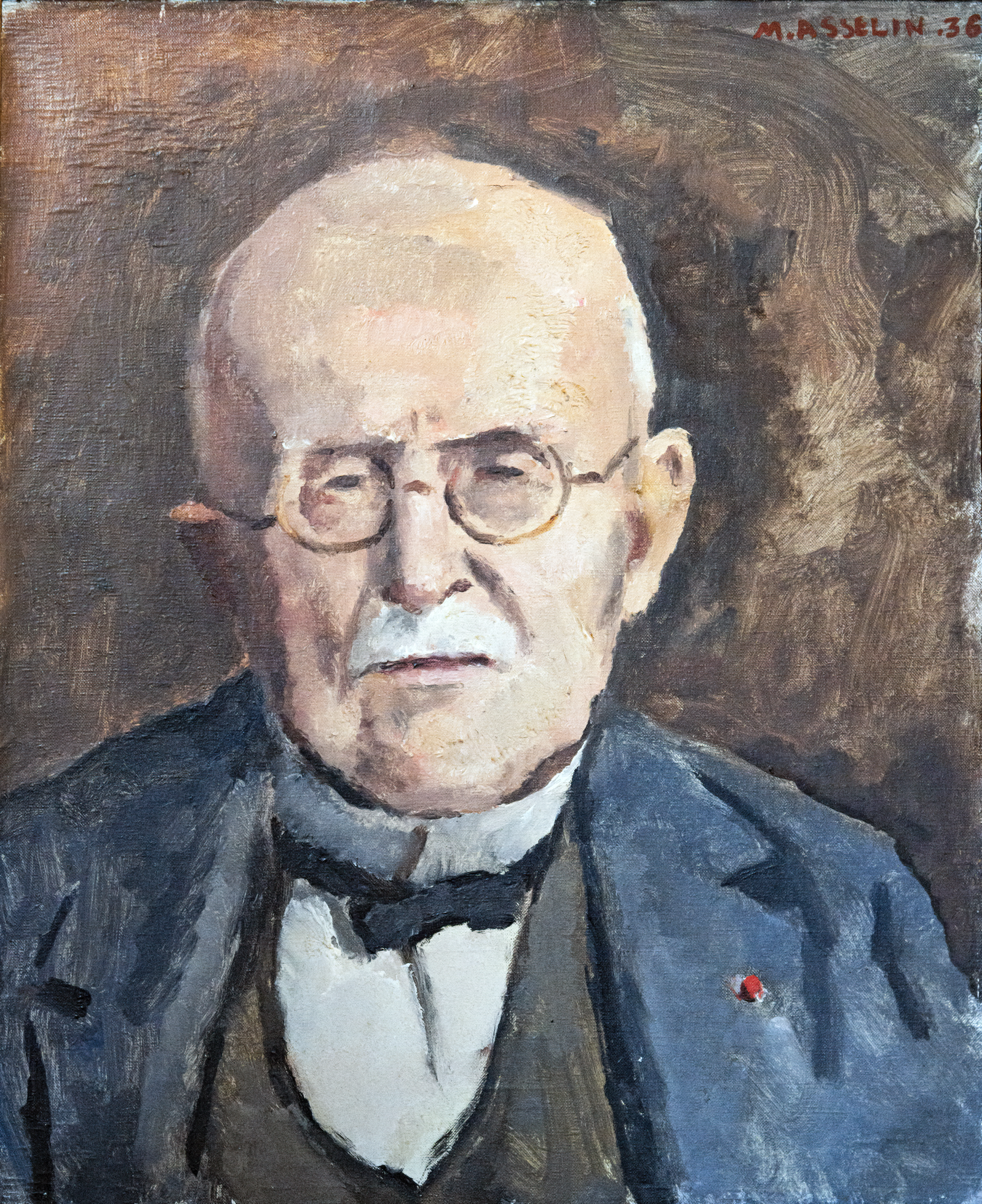
Portrait du professeur Branly (Portrait of Professor Branly) (1936) Musée Toulouse-Lautrec

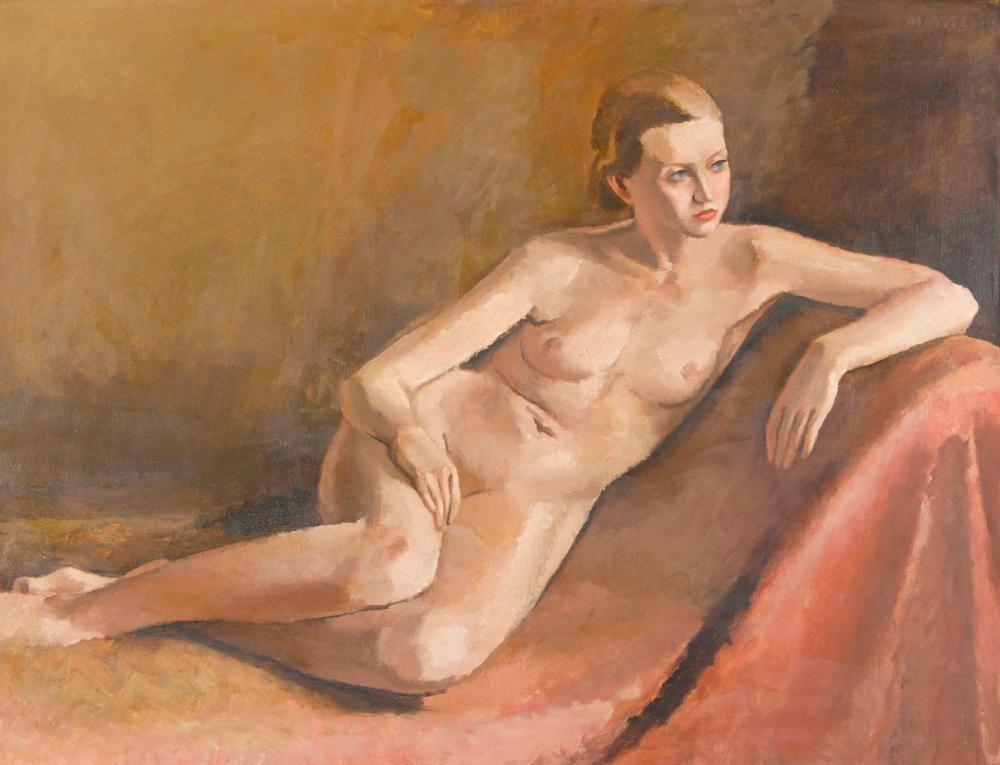
Nu allongé (Reclining nude ) (1938)

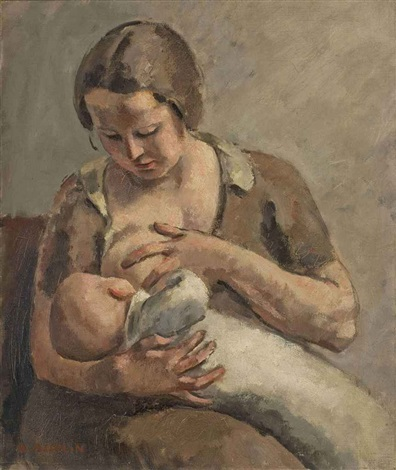
Maternité (Motherhood)

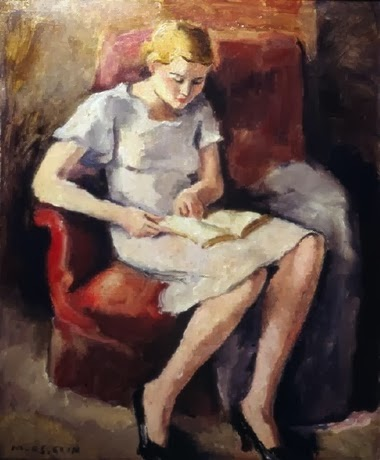
Jeune fille lisant (Young Girl Reading)

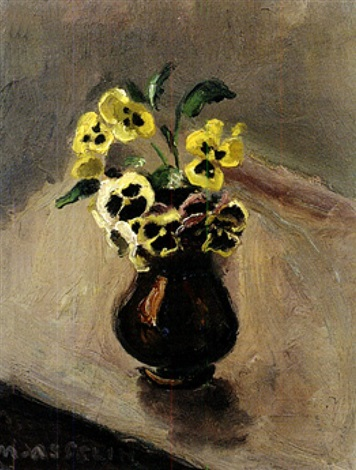
Pensées dans un vase (Thoughts in a Vase)

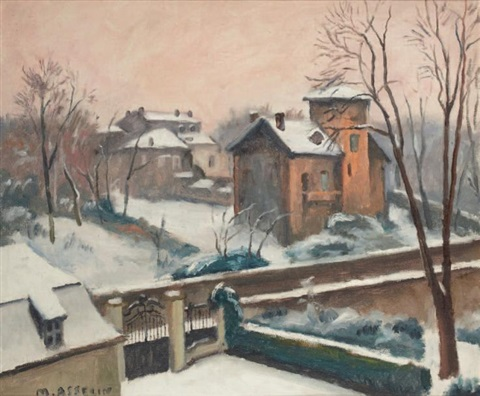
Vue de jardin (Garden View)

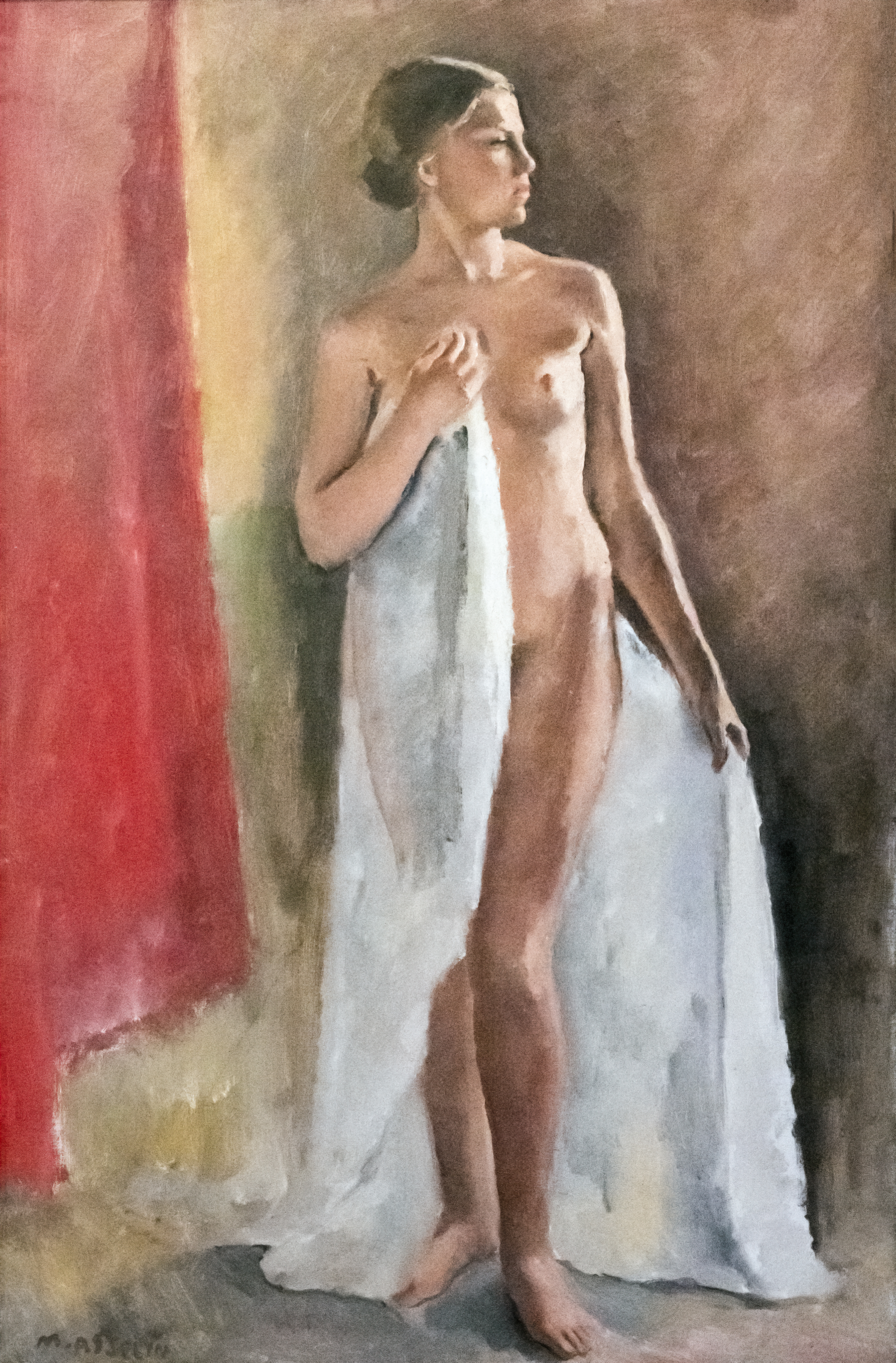
Femme nue debout (Nude Woman Standing) Musée Toulouse-Lautrec

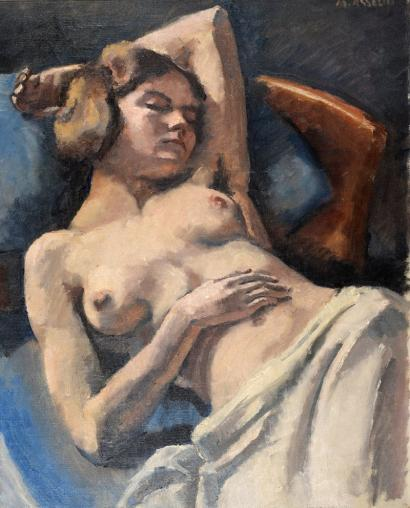
Femme assoupie le buste nu (Drowsy Woman with Nude Bust)

== Exhibitions ==
=== Solo exhibitions ===
- Galerie Eugène Blot, Paris, February 1909, December 1911, November 1916
- Galerie Devambez, 1911
- Museum of Copenhagen, 1911
- Galerie Druet, 20, Rue Royale, Paris, 1911, November 1917, December 1918, March 1923, February 1924, 1930
- Galerie Levesque, Paris, 1911
- Carfax & Co, London, February 1913, November 1915
- Galerie Vildrac, Paris, April 1914
- Galerie Georges Pesson, Paris, November 1919
- Galerie Marcel Bernheim, May 1921, November–December 1925, May 1933, May 1937, 1939
- Maurice Asselin – Rétrospective, Galerie Georges Bernheim, Paris, May 1928, May 1930
- American Women's Club, Paris, 1935
- Cent toiles et aquarelles de Maurice Asselin, Tokyo, 1935
- Galerie Charpentier, Paris, May 1935, 1943 (Cent aquarelles d'Asselin), 1945.
- Galerie Saluden, Brest, 1936
- Galerie Roger Dequoy, Paris, 1941
- Galerie Jacques Dubourg, Paris, 1943
- Galerie André Maurice, Paris, June–July 1950, 1953, December 1954 – January 1955, October 1957 (rétrospective, dixième anniversaire du décès de l'artiste)
- Galerie René Drouet, Paris, March–April 1961
- Galerie Nichido, Tokyo, 1969
- Galerie Schmidt, Paris, February–March 1970
- Hommage à Maurice Asselin – Soixante-dix toiles, aquarelles et dessins (Tribute to Maurice Asselin – Seventy paintings, watercolours and drawings), Galerie Daniel Péron, Pont-Aven, July–September 1983
- Maurice Asselin et la Bretagne, Musée des Beaux-Arts de Pont-Aven, April–June 2002

=== Exhibitions with others ===
- Salon des indépendants, Paris, from 1906
- Salon d'automne, Paris, from 1907 to 1942 (illustration de la couverture du catalogue en 1936).
- Salon des Tuileries, Paris, 1909, 1944
- Maurice Asselin, Charles Camoin, Henri Manguin, Albert Marquet, Jean Puy, Maurice de Vlaminck, Moderne Galerie, Munich, 1909
- Maurice Asselin, Lucien Mainssieux, (Note: Lucien Mainssieux (1885–1958), painter, music critic and engraver.) Claude Rameau (Note: Claude Rameau (1876–1955), painter and draughtsman.), Galerie Druet, Paris, 1913
- Exposition de l'Association des artistes de Hambourg, Hamburg, November–December 1919
- La jeune peinture française – Maurice Asselin, Roger Bissière, Louis Charlot, André Derain, Charles Dufresne, André Dunoyer de Segonzac, Jean Fernand-Trochain, (Note: Jean Fernand-Trochain (1879–1969), painter and wood engraver.) Othon Friesz, André Lhote, Robert Lotiron, (Note: Robert Lotiron (1886–1966), painter and engraver.) Maurice Utrillo, Henry de Waroquier… (Young French Painting...), Galerie Manzi-Joyant, Paris, June–July 1920
- Le premier groupe – Maurice Asselin, Albert Marquet… (The First Group...), Galerie Marcel Bernheim, 1920
- Exposition "Petites Tuileries" – Quarante peintres de l'École de Paris : Maurice Asselin, André Bauchant, Charles Kvapil, (Note: Charles Kvapil (1884–1958), Belgian painter.) Henri Lebasque, Mela Muter, Anders Osterlind, Valentine Prax, Jean Puy, Jean Souverbie, (Note: Jean Souverbie (1891–1981), painter and theatre designer.) Pierre Tal-Coat, René Thomsen, Dallas Public Art Gallery, Dallas, Texas, March–April 1932
- Exposition du Onzième groupe des artistes de ce temps : Maurice Asselin, Charles Camoin, Henri Manguin, Albert Marquet, Jean Puy, Petit Palais, Paris, December 1935 – January 1936
- Ausstellung Französischer Kunst den Gegenwart (Exhibition of Contemporary French Art), Preussische Akademie der Künste, Berlin, June 1937
- Le quatrième Salon de Mai à Orléans, Musée des beaux-arts d'Orléans, 1948
- Undated exhibition: Maurice Asselin (peintures) et Louis Dejean (sculptures), Galerie Pigalle, Paris
- Marius Borgeaud ou la magie de l'instant ('Marius Borgeaud or the magic of the moment), Fondation Gianadda, Martigny (Switzerland), November 2001 – January 2002
- Les peintres graveurs et la mer (Painters, Engravers and the Sea), Espace Mélanie, Riec-sur-Bélon, August 2007
- De Gauguin à Marcel Gromaire, la naissance d'un musée (From Gauguin to Marcel Gromaire, the birth of a museum), Musée de Pont-Aven, August–September 2012.
- Boire aux Champs libres (Drinking in the Open Fields), Rennes, November 2015 – April 2016

== Sales ==
- Delorme et Collin du Bocage, auctioneers, Vente de l'atelier Maurice Asselin (Sale of the Maurice Asselin Workshop), salle des ventes du 9, rue de Provence, Paris, 9 March 2017

== Bibliography ==
- Vauxcelles, Louis (1909). Maurice Asselin (in French). Paris: Éditions Galerie Eugène Blot.
- Salmon, André (1912). La Jeune peinture française (in French). Paris: Société des Trente, Albert Messein. ASIN B00175ASVI.
- Asselin, Maurice (1919). Maurice Asselin (in French). Paris: Éditions Galerie Georges Pesson.
- Romains, Jules (1 February 1921). "À propos des aquarelles d'Asselin". 'L'Amour de l'art' (in French). pp. 383–386.
- Carco, Francis (1921–1922). "Maurice Asselin". L'Art et les artistes (in French). Vol. IV. pp. 391–395.
- Carco, Francis (1924). "Maurice Asselin: Les Peintres français nouveaux". Nouvelle Revue Française (in French). No. 18. ASIN B0789NB795.
- Fegdal, Charles (1925). Ateliers d'artistes – Trente-cinq portraits d'artistes (in French). Stock.
- Bord, Benjamin (1926). Les Eaux-fortes de Maurice Asselin (in French). Aesculape. pp. 36–38.
- Escholier, Raymond (1926). Maurice Asselin, peintre et lithographe (in French). Paris: Éditions Georges Crès.
- Adrianne, Charlotte (1927). "Maurice Asselin Le Peintre de la tendresse". L'Officiel de la Mode (in French). No. 70.
- René-Jean (1928). M. Asselin (in French). Crès Georges et Cie.
- Alazard, Jean (November 1928). "Maurice Asselin". L'Amour de l'art (in French). No. 11. pp. 433–436.
- Turpin, Georges (April 1932). "Maurice Asselin". Tache d'encre (in French). No. 8. pp. 7–10.
- Bazin, Germain (January 1933). "Le Réveil des traditions sensibles". L'Amour de l'art (in French). No. 1. pp. 175–181.
- Mac Orlan, Pierre (1941). Peintures de Maurice Asselin (Paintings of Maurice Asselin) (in French). Paris: Éditions Galerie Roger Dequoy.
- René-Jean (1943). Asselin: Œuvres récentes (in French). Paris: Galerie Jacques Dubourg.
- Carco, Francis (1945). Maurice Asselin (in French). Gallimard.
- Nacenta, Raymond (1945). Maurice Asselin (in French). Éditions Galerie Charpentier.
- Dorgelès, Roland (1947). Bouquet de bohème (in French). Éditions Albin Michel. ASIN B005DZVHJA.
- Mac Orlan, Pierre (1955). Le Mémorial du petit jour (mémoires) (in French). Gallimard. ASIN B01MSYC1VH.
- Dorival, Bernard (1957). Les Peintres du xx^{e} du cubisme à l'abstraction – 1914–1957 (in French). Paris: Éditions Pierre Tisné. ASIN B005SG9J26.
- Sandoz, Marc (1959). Éloge de Maurice Asselin – gravures originales de Maurice Asselin (in French). Éditions Manuel Bruker.
- Nacenta, Raymond (1960). The School of Paris – The Painters and the Artistic Climate of Paris since 1910. London: Oldbourne Press. ISBN 978-1397695376.
- Hasegawa, Tokushichi (1969). Maurice Asselin. Tokyo: Nichido Garo.
- Jeanson, Henri (18 February – 13 March 1970). M. Asselin. 1882 - 1947 (in French). galerie Schmidt.
- Huyghe, René; Rudel, Jean (1970). L'Art et le monde moderne (in French). Vol. 2. Larousse. ASIN B09R9V7PMR.
- Schurr, Gérald [in French] (1975). Les Petits maîtres de la peinture, valeur de demain (in French). Vol. 1. Les Éditions de l'Amateur. ISBN 978-2859175368.
- Cassou, Jean; Courthion, Pierre; Dorival, Bernard; Duby, Georges; Fauchereau, Serge; Huyghe, René; Leymarie, Jean; Monneret, Jean; Parinaud, André; Roumeguère, Pierre; Seuphor, Michel (1984). Un siècle d'art moderne – L'histoire du Salon des indépendants (A century of modern art – The history of the Salon des indépendants) (in French). Denoël. ISBN 978-2207229965.
- Barrer, Patrick-F.; Bigot, Stéphanie; Lhotis, Agnès; de Wilhem, Patrice (1992). Quand l'art du XXe siècle était conçu par des inconnus: L'histoire du Salon d'Automne de 1903 à nos jours (in French). Éditions Arts et Images du Monde. ASIN B000J42LR2.
- Lévêque, Jean-Jacques (1992). Les années folles, 1918–1939: le triomphe de l'art moderne (in French). ACR Édition.
- Belbeoch, Henri (1993). Les peintres de Concarneau (in French). Éditions Palatines. ISBN 2950468551.
- Schurr, Gérald [in French] (1996). Le guidargus de la peinture (in French). Les Éditions de l'Amateur. ISBN 2859172084.
- Roussard, André (1999). Dictionnaire des peintres à Montmartre: Peintres, sculpteurs, graveurs, dessinateurs, illustrateurs, plasticiens aux 19e et 20e siècles (in French). Éditions André Roussard. ISBN 978-2951360105.
- Bénézit, Emmanuel (1999). Dictionnaire des peintres, sculpteurs, dessinateurs et graveurs (Benezit Dictionary of Artists) (in French). Vol. 1. Gründ. pp. 506–507. ISBN 978-2700030105.
- Sickert, Walter (2000). Gruetzner Robins, Anna (ed.). The Complete Writings on Art. Oxford: Oxford University Press. ISBN 978-0198172253.
- Palmade, Séverine (2000). L'Hôtel de la Poste - Au rendez-vous des artistes, chez Ernest et Julia Correlleau (in French). Éditions de la Société des amis du Musée de Pont-Aven. ASIN B000WTPRMA.
- Delarge, Jean-Pierre (2001). Dictionnaire des arts plastiques modernes et contemporains (in French). Gründ. ISBN 978-2700030556.
- Asselin, Georges; Mac Orlan, Pierre; Puget, Catherine (2002). Maurice Asselin, 1882-1947 et la Bretagne : Exposition, Pont-Aven, Musée de Pont-Aven, 23 mars-24 juin 2002 (in French). Musée des beaux-arts de Pont-Aven. ISBN 978-2910128265.
- Baron, Wendy (2006). Sickert: Paintings and Drawings. New Haven and London: Yale University Press. ISBN 978-0300111293.
- Les petits livres du terroir. Montmartre à la campagne : l'Auberge de l'Œuf dur et de l'Amour à Saint-Cyr-sur-Morin (PDF) (in French). Éditions Terroirs. Archived from the original (PDF) on 4 March 2022.
- Charzat, Michel (2010). La Jeune peinture française: 1910–1940 une époque, un art de vivre (in French). édition Hazan. ASIN B0160JJZ32.
- Poma, Pierre (March 2015). "Lectures de Mac Orlan n°3, 2015, Pierre Mac Orlan et les peintres" (in French). La Société des lecteurs de Pierre Mac Orlan.
