= Ferdinand Humbert =

French painter

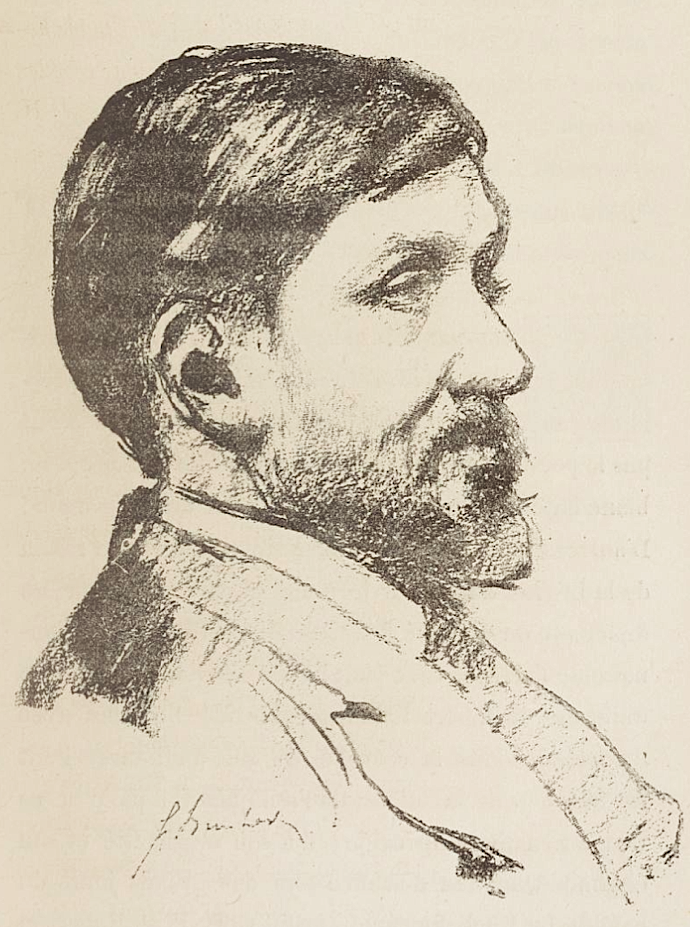
Self-portrait (1883)

Jacques-Ferdinand Humbert (8 October 1842, in Paris – 6 October 1934, in Paris) was a French painter who specialized in portraits and historical scenes.

== Life and work ==
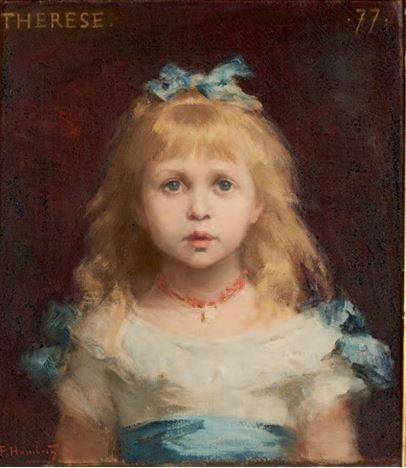
Thérèse Billotte, granddaughter of Eugène Fromentin

His uncle, Jean Charles Ferdinand Humbert (1813–1881), was a famous landscape painter who had studied with Ingres. He received his education at the École nationale supérieure des Beaux-Arts in Paris, where he enrolled in 1861. His teachers there included François-Édouard Picot, Alexandre Cabanel and Eugène Fromentin. His first showing at the Salon came in 1865, with a canvas depicting the "Flight of Nero". He received awards at subsequent Salons in 1866, 1867 and 1869.

In 1874, he began what would become his major life's work; "Pro Patria" (For the Homeland), a series of wall paintings at the Panthéon, which were completed in 1900. They comprised a cycle of the history of France and Paris, as well as a celebration of the Republic.

His fame extended outside France and he was especially well known among Parisians as a master of female portraiture. He served as a Professor at the École nationale until 1902, a few years after he opened his own art academy in the former studios of Fernand Cormon. Later, he was awarded the Legion of Honor; eventually becoming a Commander.

== Académie Humbert ==
While still young, he and his friend, Henri Gervex, gave private painting lessons. In 1898, he opened his own art studio, near the Moulin Rouge on Montmartre. At first, his students were mostly Americans. Later, Georges Braque would meet Marie Laurencin there. Raoul Dufy, Pierre Waidmann and Othon Friesz were also among his students. As time passed, Humbert limited himself to teaching on Saturdays; while Tuesday and Thursday classes were conducted by his friends, François Thévenot (1856-1943) and Albert-Charles Wallet. Nude models of various ages were available for an additional annual fee of 320 Francs.

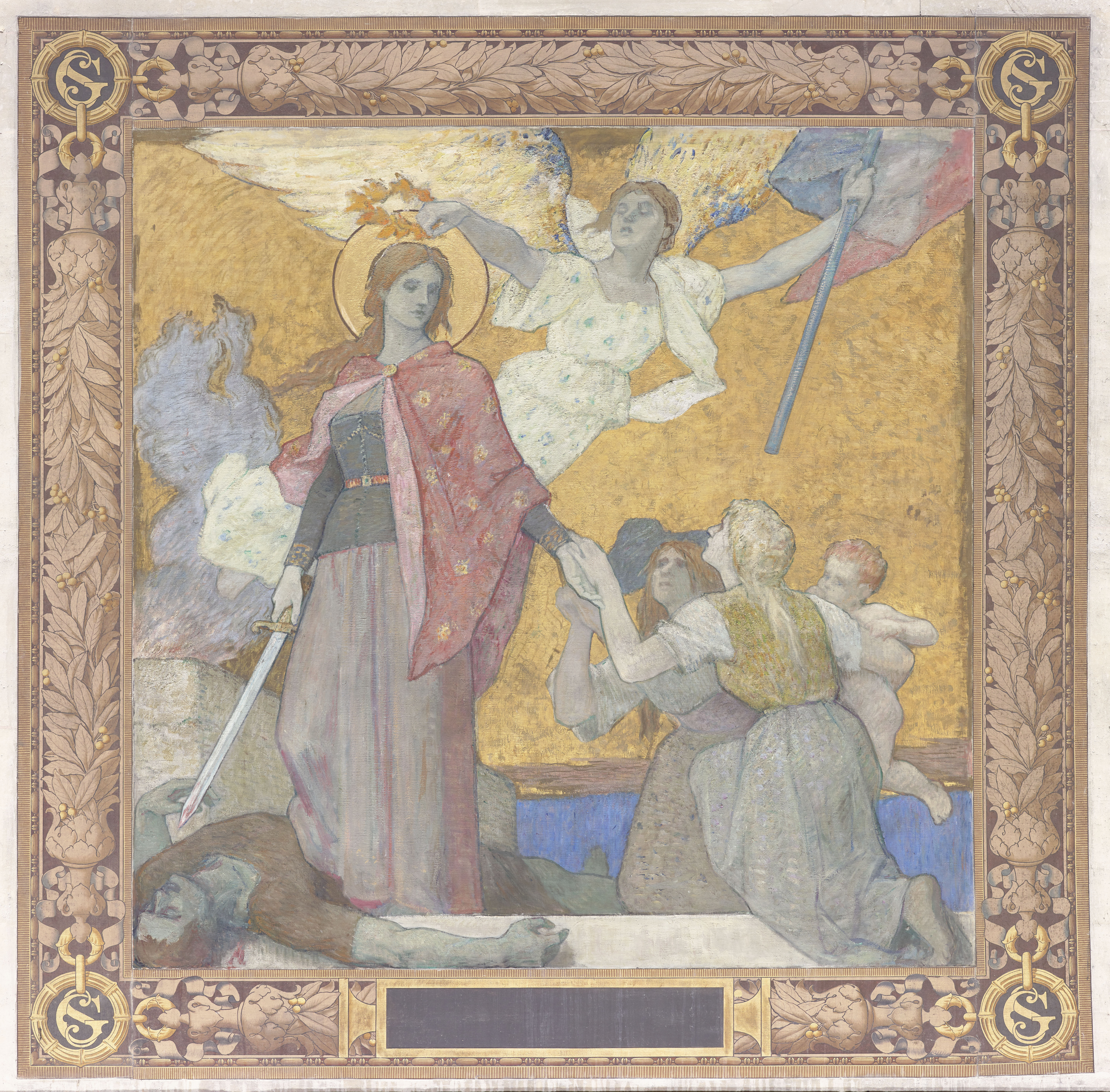
Liberty (Panthéon)

His other notable students included Marius Borgeaud, Marguerite Carpentier, Fernande Cormier, Cecilia Cuţescu-Storck, Andrée Lavieille, Henri Marret, and Francis Picabia.
