= Pierre Waidmann =

French painter, photographer, sculptor (1860–1937)

Pierre Waidmann (Remiremont, August 19, 1860 – Neuilly-sur-Seine, October 26, 1937) was a French painter and sculptor. He was a landscape painter and also a photographer.

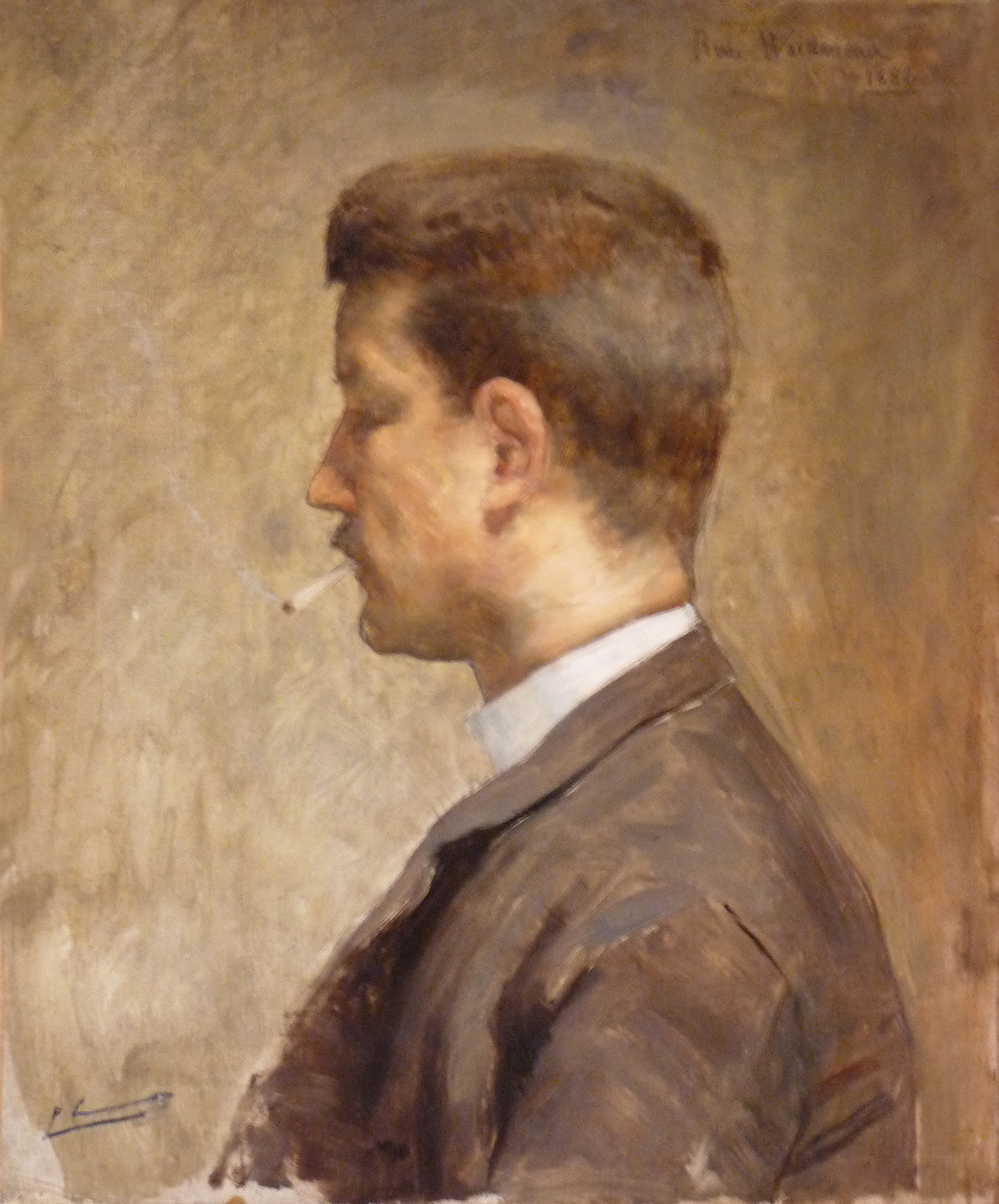
Self-portrait with cigarette

== Biography ==
Pierre Waidmann, born into a wealthy family and sensitive to the arts, moved from his native Lorraine to Paris in the late 1870s to study with Ferdinand Humbert and François-Louis Français. Ten years later he was also a pupil of Alfred Roller and Henri Gervex. In 1890 he took up residence in Paris, at 66 rue de Lisbonne, but he still returned regularly to stay at the home of his grandfather, the collector Charles Friry (1802–1881) where he painted numerous landscapes of the Vosges region.

In the historic 18th-century mansion where he was born, Waidmann created the interior decorations (especially marquetry and overdoors) in many rooms. In about 1884, he even set up his atelier there. He died in 1937 in Neuilly-sur-Seine, at the age of 77.

In 2011, the two museums of Remiremont, the Charles de Bruyères Museum and the Charles-Friry Museum, dedicated a retrospective to him, grouping together a hundred of his works, including sixty paintings, ceramics, terracottas and bindings.

In February and March 1896 he had a show at Le Barc de Boutteville, an avant-garde gallery in Paris

== Gallery ==
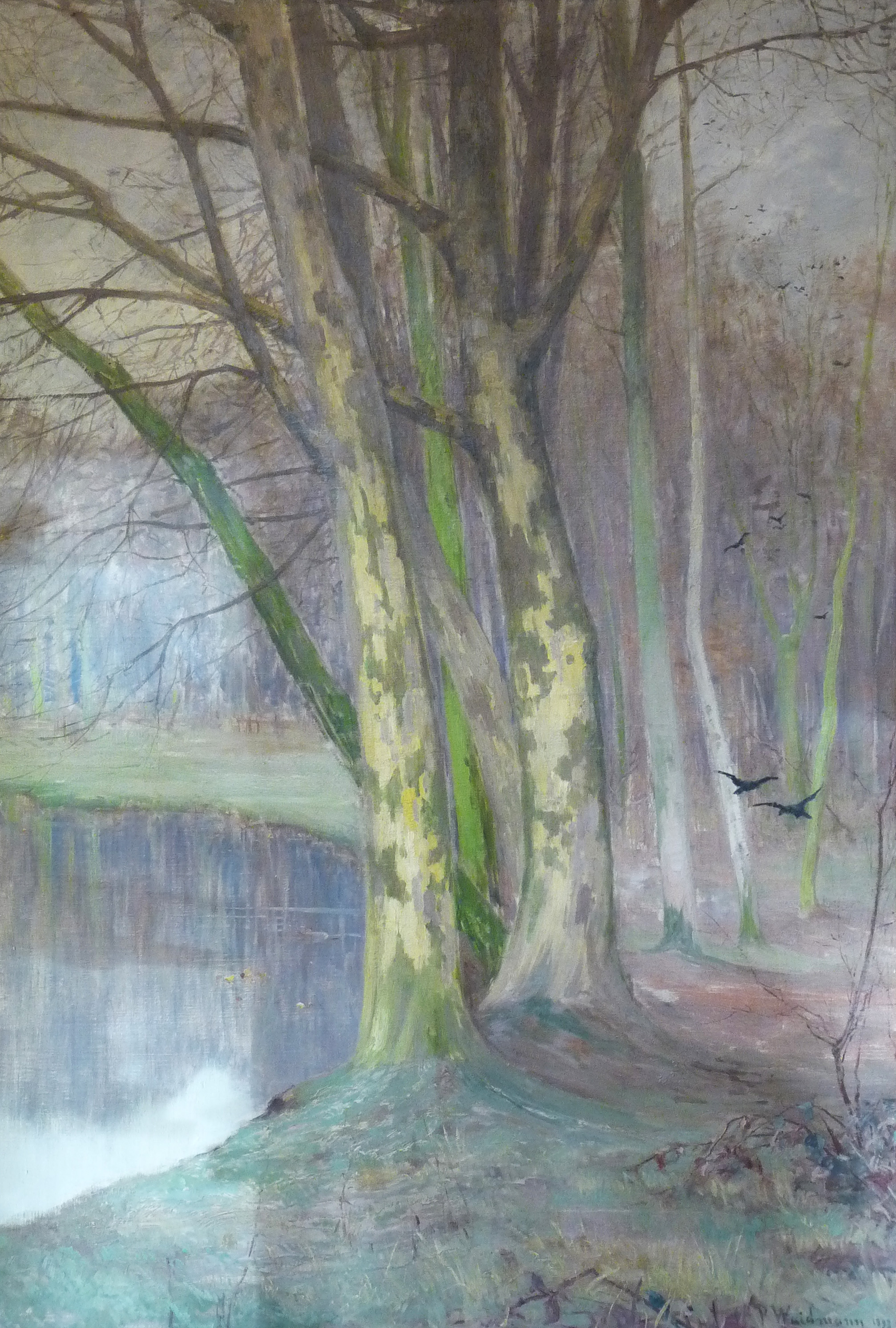
Platanes au bord de l'eau (Plane Trees at the Water's Edge) (1893)

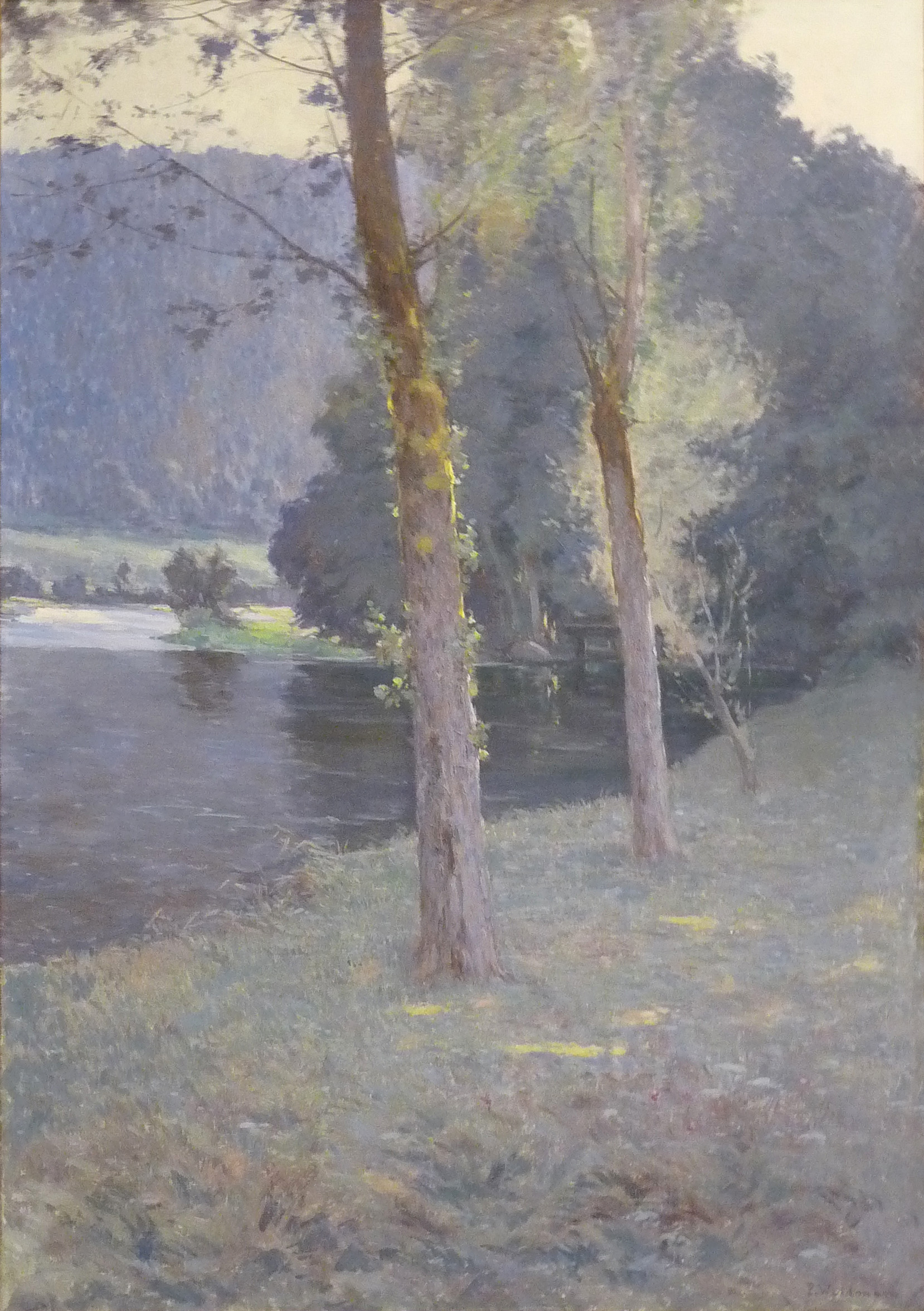
Au Bord de l'eau: au pays des Vosges (At the Water's Edge: In the Country of the Vosges) (1892), oil on canvas, Charles-Friry Museum

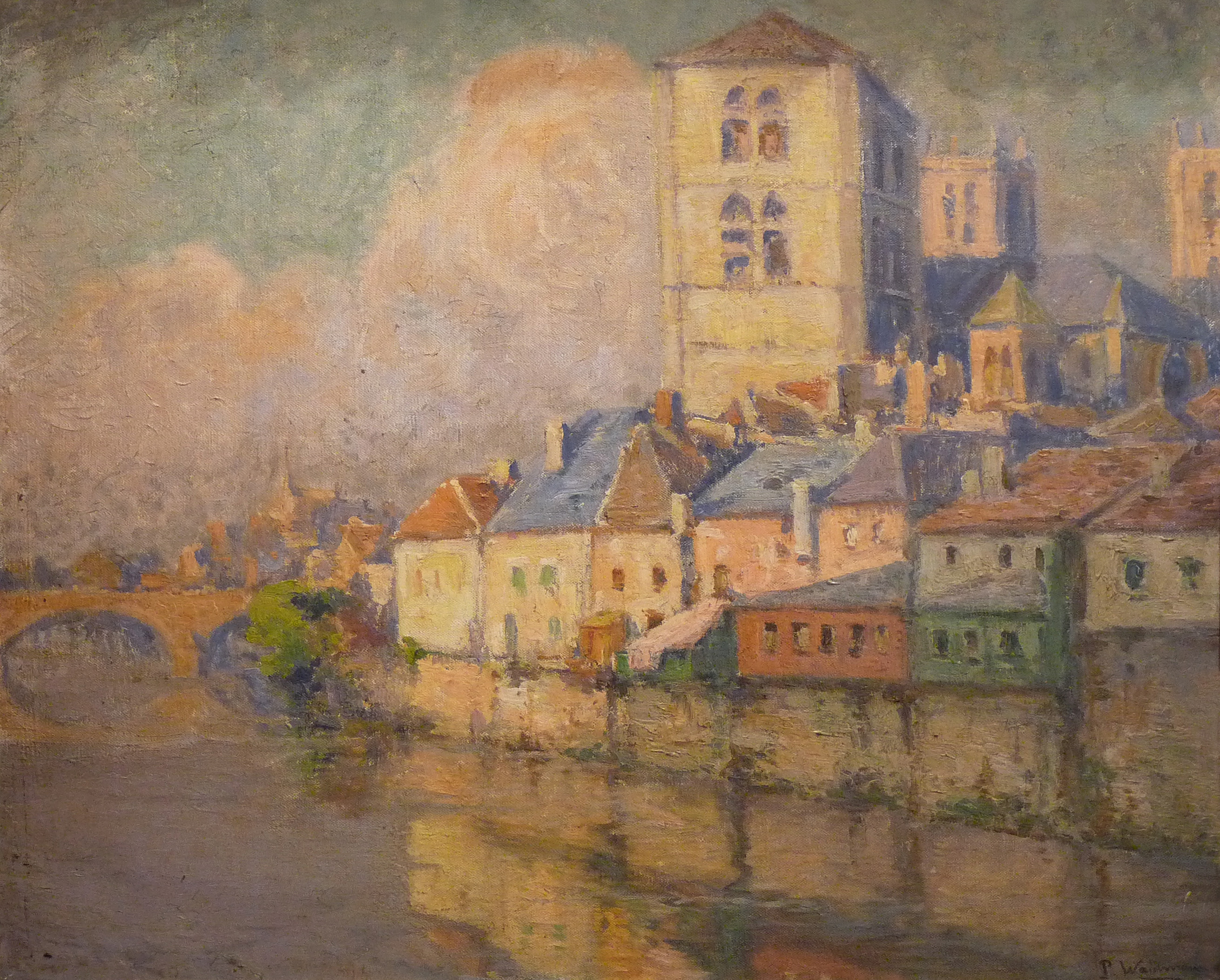
Huy (ca. 1906), oil on canvas, Charles-Friry Museum

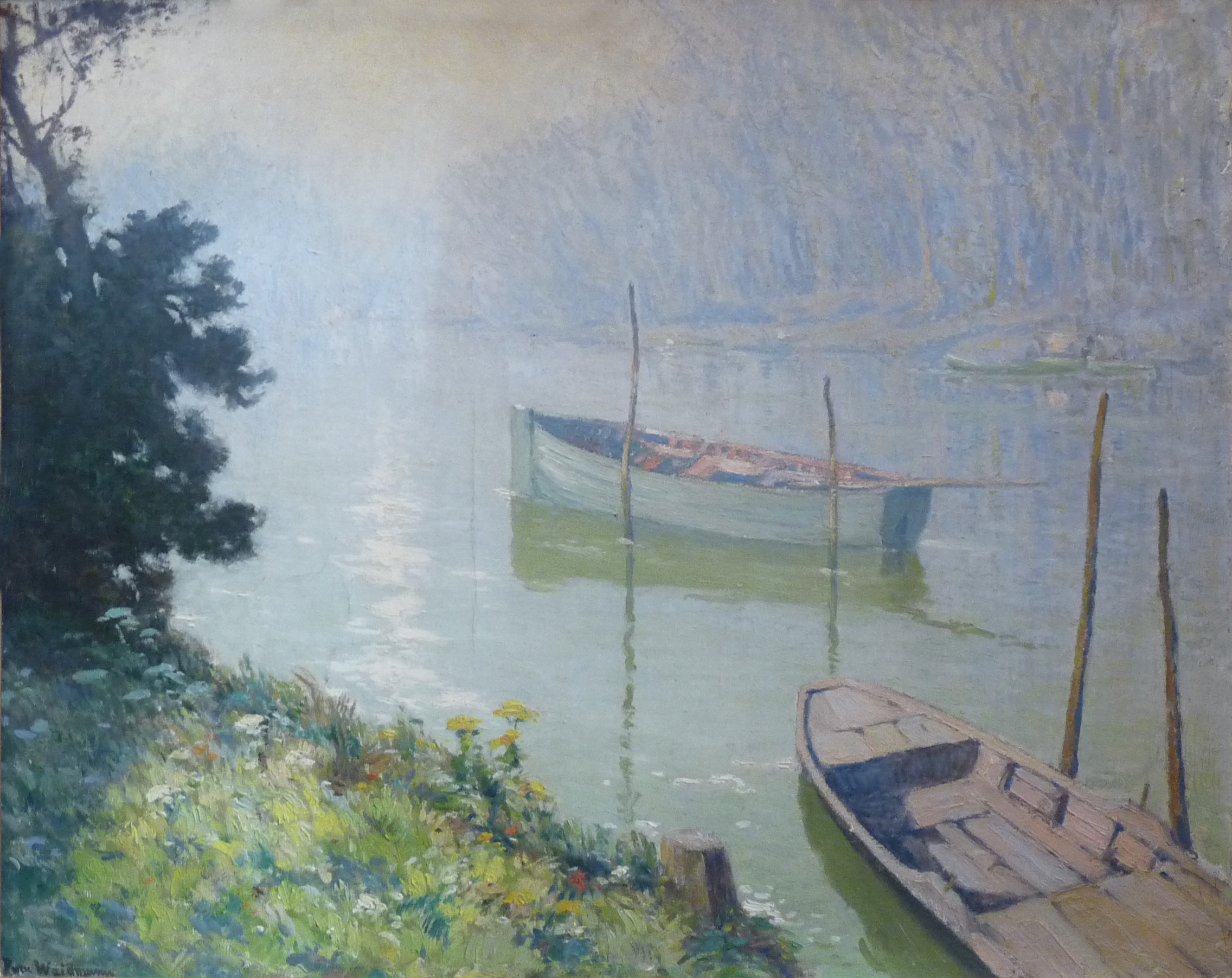
Printemps (Spring) (ca. 1909), oil on canvas, Charles-Friry Museum

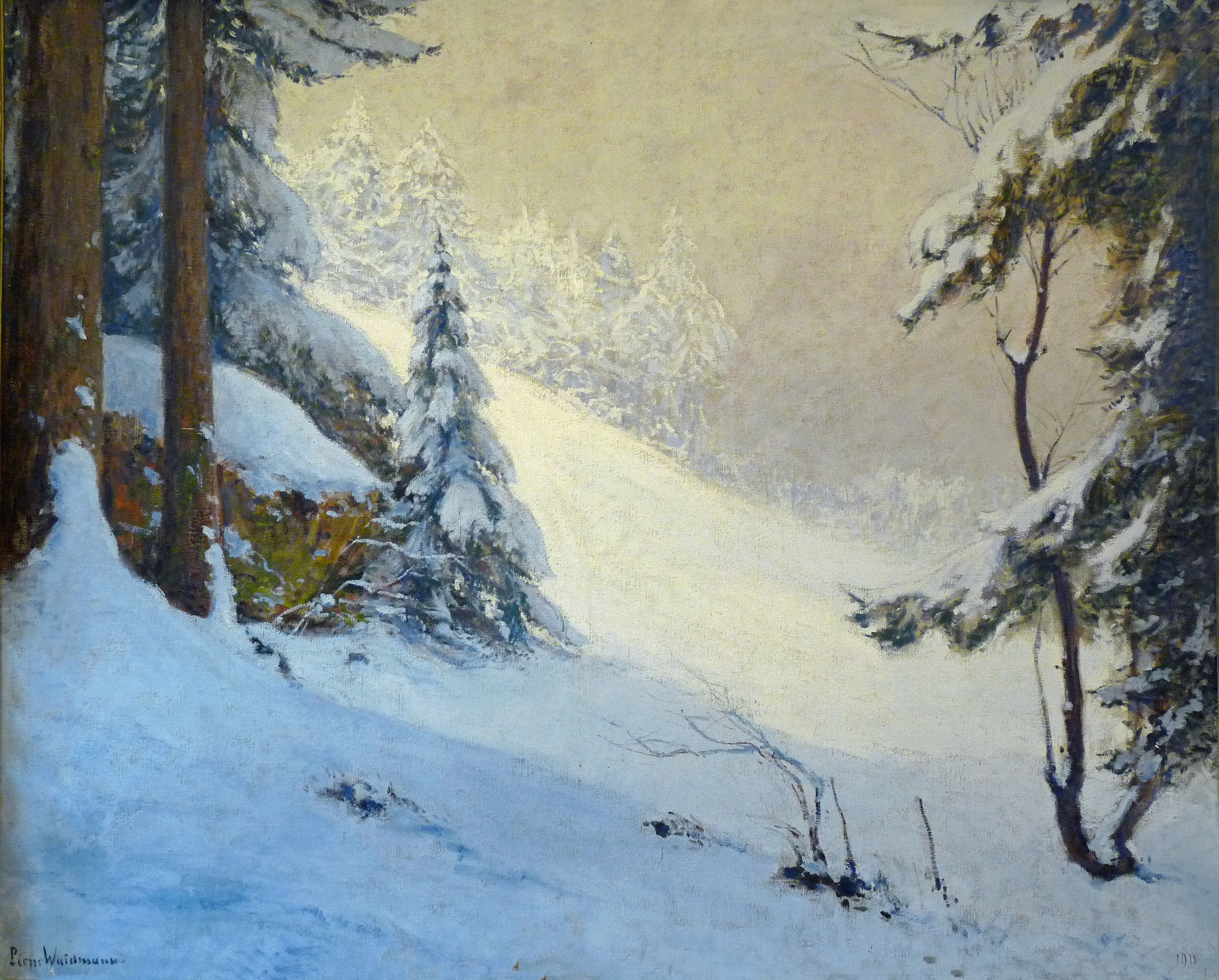
Effet de neige (Snow Effect) (1911), oil on canvas, Charles-Friry Museum

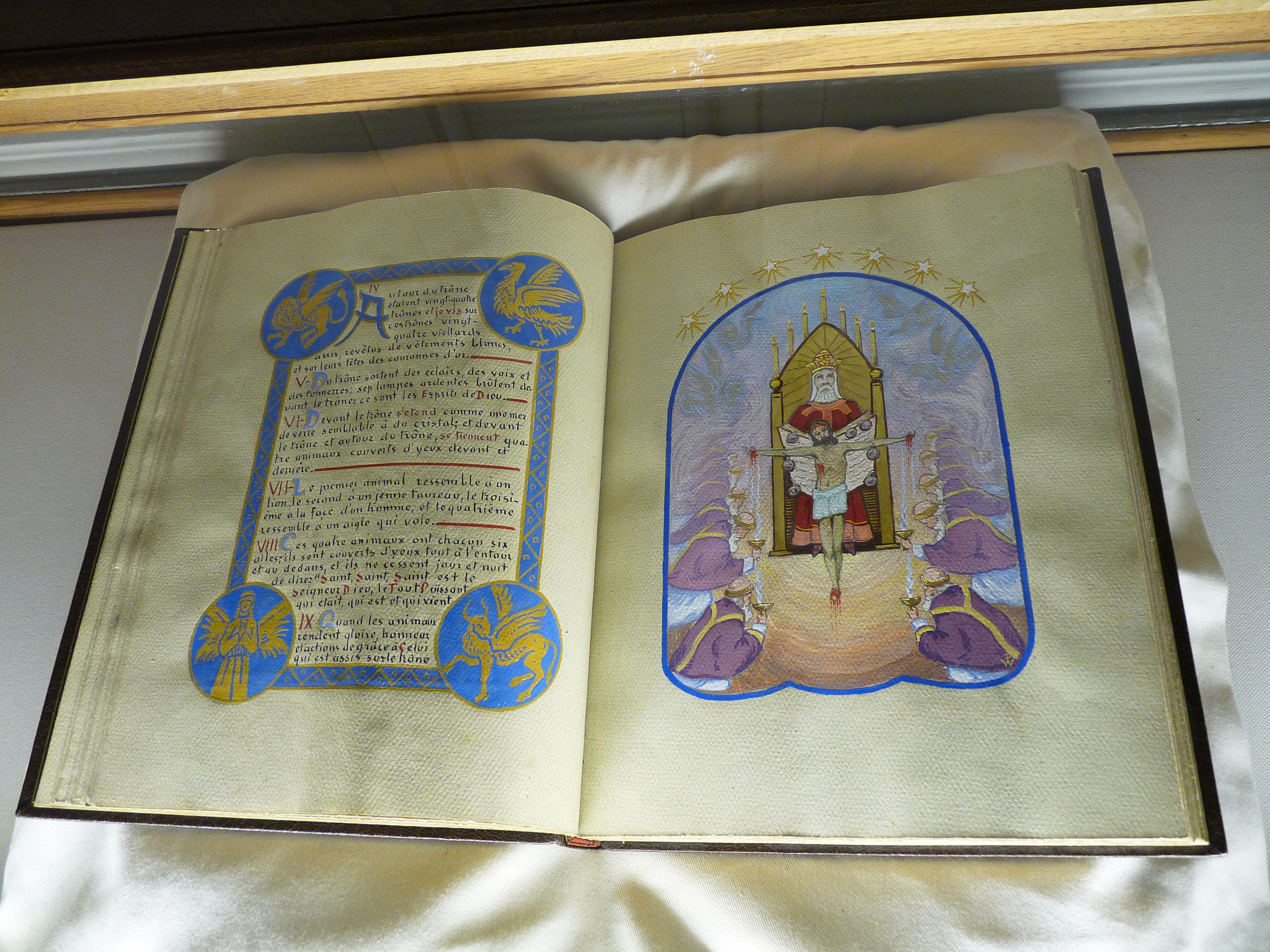
Apocalypse selon Saint Jean (Apocalypse According to Saint John) (1930), illuminated book, Charles-Friry Museum

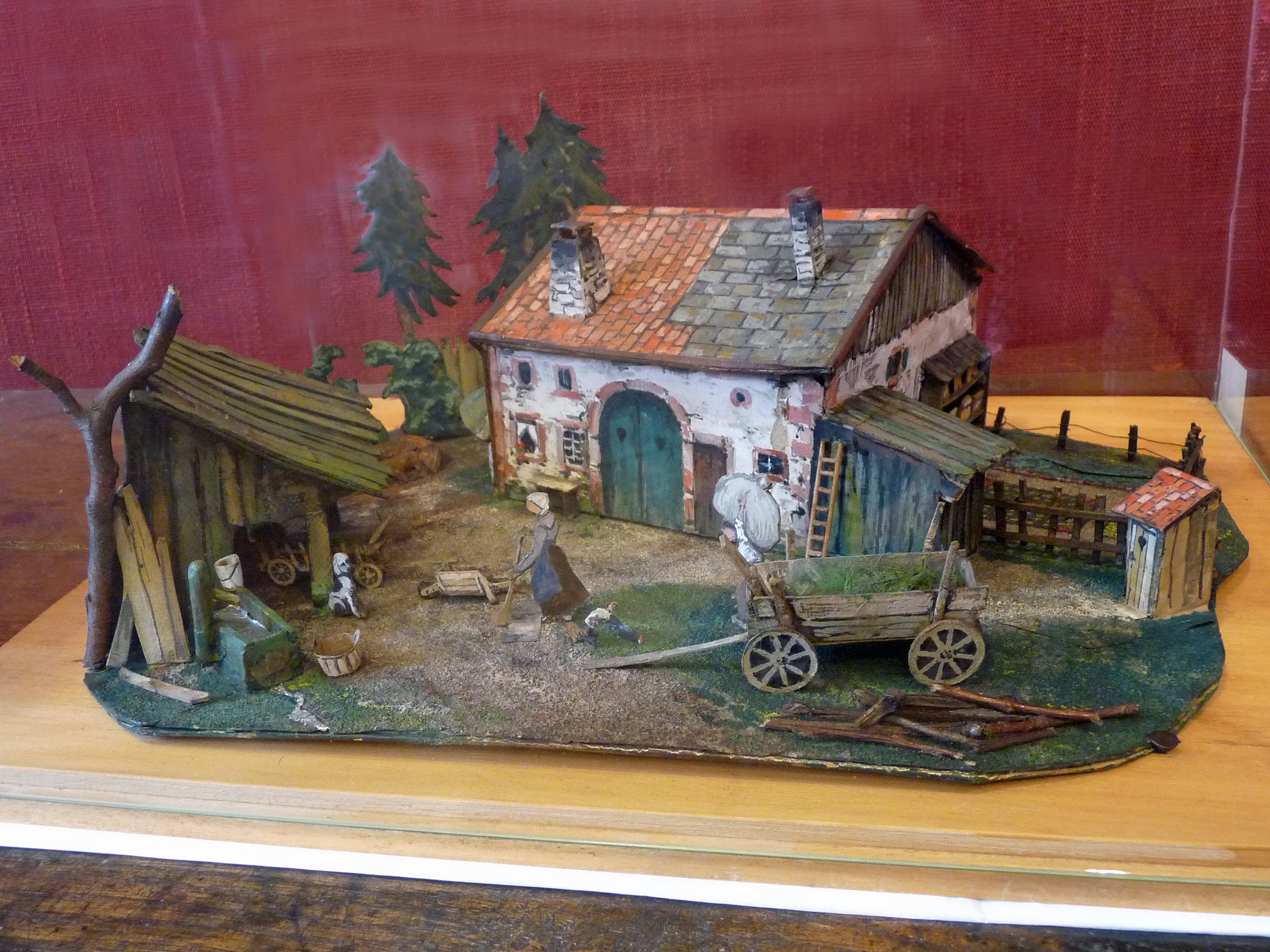
Maquette de la ferme (Model of the Farm)(ca. 1933), oil on cardboard and wood, Charles de Bruyères Museum

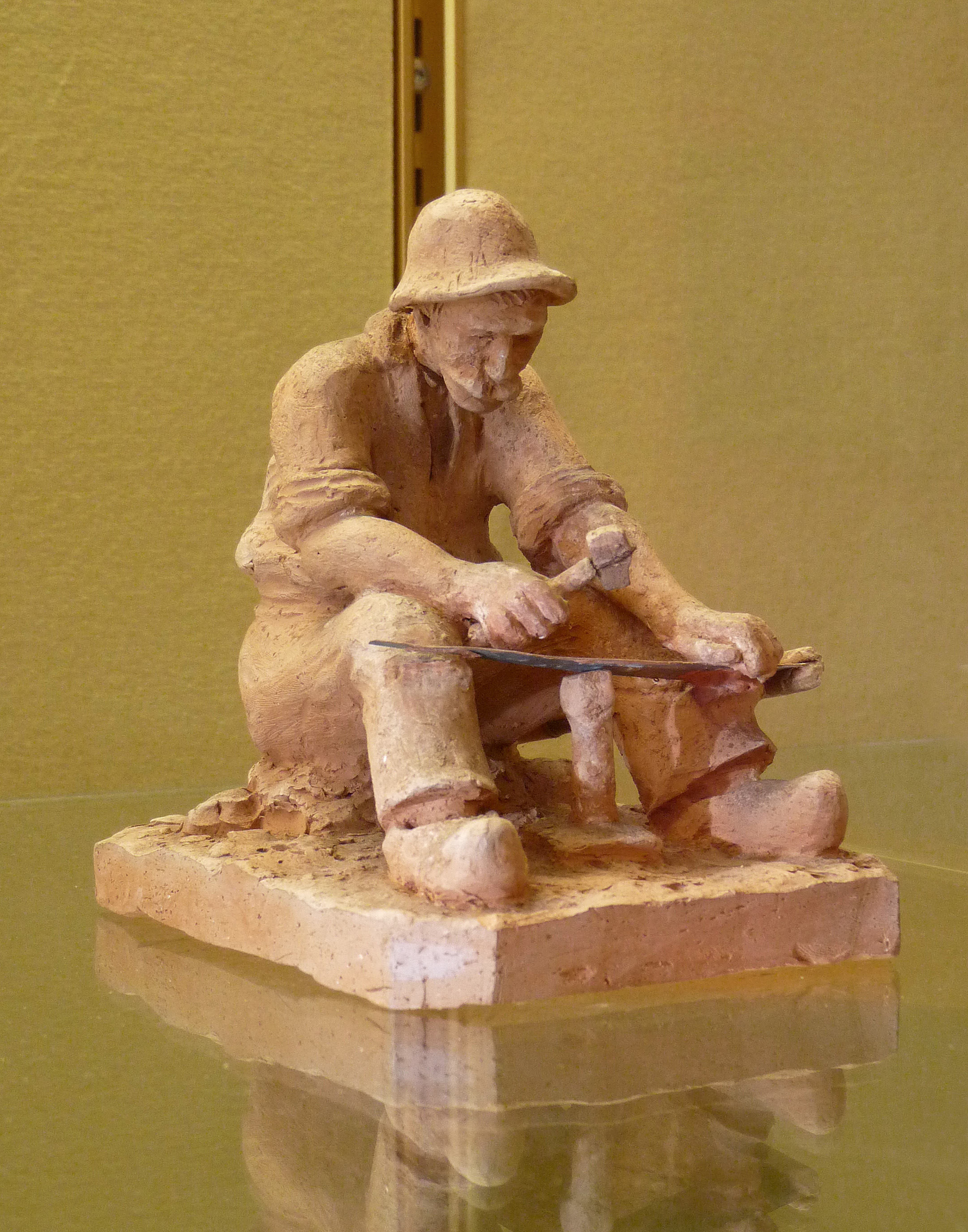
Batteur de faux (Scythe Beater) (before 1936), clay pottery, Charles-Friry Museum

== Other works ==
- Dans le jardin, 1886
- Au bord de la Moselle, environs de Remiremont, 1887
- Un pré dans les Vosges
- La Moselle, 1888
- Première neige dans les Vosges
- La Vallée de Saint-Amé, 1889
- Ruisseau dans les Vosges, 1890
- Soleil de Mars
- Eau courante dans les Vosges
- Mortagne dans les Vosges
- La Moselle, 1894
- Le Trou de Roisgneux, 1896

== Bibliography ==
- Pierre Waidmann… : l'exposition de ses tableaux (Pierre Waidmann: A Showing of his Paintings), "Galerie des artistes modernes" (Gallery of Modern Artists), Paris, 1905.
- Exposition Pierre Waidmann, "Galerie Georges Petit", 1907.
- Léopold Honoré, Nos artistes: Pierre Waidmann (Our Artists: Pierre Weismann), in "La revue lorraine illustrée", Number 3, July–September 1910, pp. 93–96.
- Pierre Heili, Pierre Waidmann, in "Les Vosgiens célèbres. Dictionnaire biographique illustré" (Famous People of the Vosges: Illustrated Biographical Dictionary), Albert Ronsin ed. Vagney, published by Editions Gérard Louis, 1990, pp. 367–368 – ISBN 2-907016-09-1.
- Roland Conilleau, Jean-Pierre Stocchetti, Pierre Waidmann, une vie d'artiste (Pierre Waidmann, An Artist's Life), Haroué, Ediz. Gérard Louis, 2011, 96pp. – ISBN 978-2-357-63028-4.
- Pierre Waidmann (1860–1937), un peintre en résidence (Pierre Waidmann (1860–1937), An Artist in Residence, municipal museums, 2011, 36 pp. (Catalog of the retrospective).

== See also ==
- Wikimedia Commons has images and other materials at Pierre Waidmann
