= Young African Woman =

Painting by Fernand Cormon

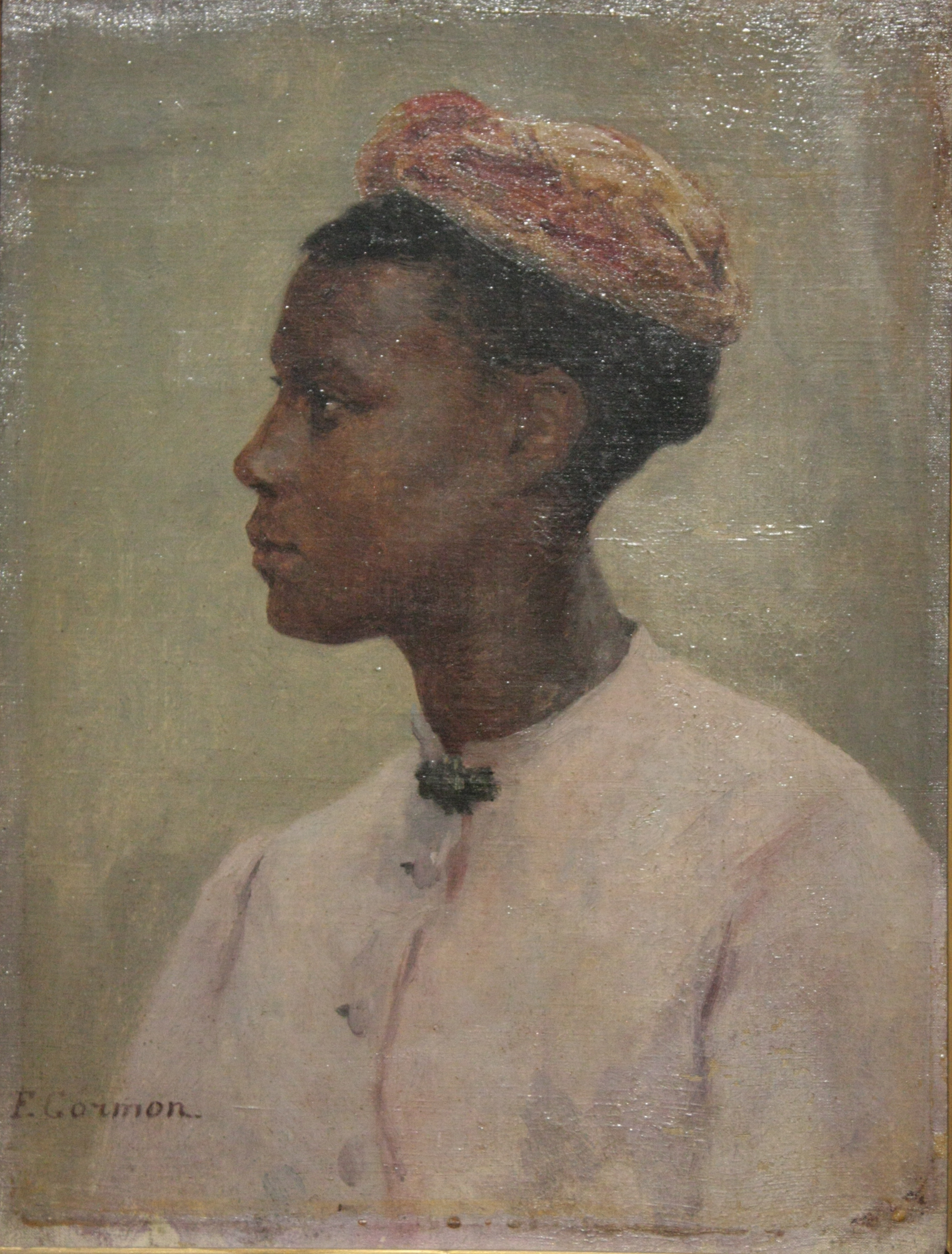
Young African Woman (1890s) by Fernand Cormon

Young African Woman (French: La Jeune Africaine ) is a late 19th century oil on canvas painting by Fernand Cormon, produced during his stay in Tunisia and now in the musée des Beaux-Arts de Pau. Previously known as Young Negress (Jeune nègre), it was renamed for the 26 March-21 July 2019 Musée d'Orsay exhibition Le Modèle noir, de Géricault à Matisse to remove the racist connotations - Lilian Thuram, creator of an anti-racist foundation, and the poet Abd al Malik created commentaries on some of the works exhibited.

== History ==
In 1880 Cormon opened his studio at 10 rue Constance on Montmartre hill and three years later founded a private art school at 104 boulevard de Clichy. His studio was considered one of the best in Paris, training Matisse, Toulouse-Lautrec and Vincent van Gogh.

His style did not remain uniform, but varied over the course of time, even in relation to the topics covered. An orientalist painter, with hot and sensual tones, he also painted factory interiors with workers at work and prehistoric scenes, the latter being a trend at the French academy in the 1880s and 1890s.

== Bibliography (in French) ==
- Philippe Comte (1978). Catalogue raisonné des peintures: Ville de Pau, Musée des beaux-arts (in French). Pau: ville de Pau..
- Guide du musée des beaux-arts de Pau (in French). RMN-Grand-Palais. 27 March 2019. ISBN 9782711863167..
- Le modèle noir : de Géricault à Matisse: Musée d'Orsay (in French). Paris: "Beaux-arts" éditions. 2019. ISBN 979-10-204-0522-7..
