= Marius Borgeaud =

Swiss artist (1861–1924)

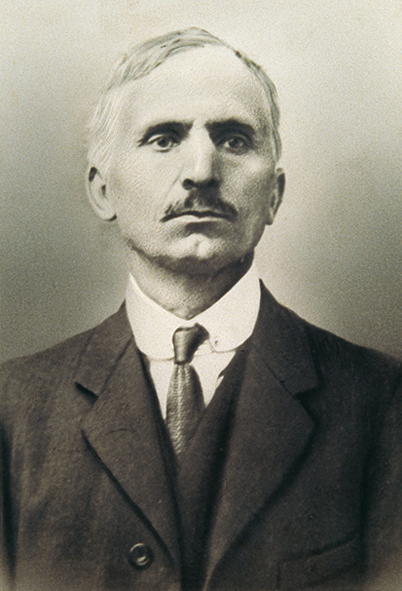
- Marius Borgeaud in Paris, 1919
- Born: 21 September 1861; Lausanne, Vaud, Switzerland
- Died: 16 July 1924 (aged 62); Paris, France
- Movement: Post-Impressionism

Marius Borgeaud (French pronunciation: [maʁjys bɔʁʒo]; 21 September 1861 – 16 July 1924) was a Swiss Post-Impressionist painter.

== Early life ==
Borgeaud came from a bourgeois milieu; he attended the Industrial School of Lausanne and did not intend to pursue painting. As chance would have it, the future gallerist Paul Vallotton was one of his school-mates. In 1888, he began working in a bank in Marseille and remained there until the death of his father the following year. He inherited a significant legacy. The following decade saw Borgeaud squander that legacy by leading an expensive life, particularly in Paris. His excessive lifestyle threatened his health and forced him to detox on the shores of Lake Constance in 1900 under guardianship. Shortly after he returned to settle in Paris was when he devoted himself to painting.

== Paris ==
His arrival in Paris, aspiring to become a painter at the turn of the twentieth century, was not out of the ordinary. The Swiss art colony there was healthy; some of its famous members were Félix Vallotton, Théophile Alexandre Steinlen, Eugène Grasset, Ernest Bieler, and René Auberjonois. After he became well-integrated among them around 1906, Borgeaud joined the Paris section of the Society of Painters and Swiss Architects.

His apprenticeship, between 1901 and 1903, was under the artists Fernand Cormon and Ferdinand Humbert, each of whom had a famous academy. Borgeaud's work from this era is mostly lost, and there are no known canvases before 1904.

Arriving late in the trade, at the age of forty, he frequently called on artists younger than himself. Some of them become friends such as Francis Picabia, Paul de Castro (1882–1939), Maurice Asselin (1882–1947) and especially Morerod Edward (1879–1919). Beginning in 1904 or 1905, he spent several summers painting with Picabia at Moret-sur-Loing (Seine-et-Marne) with brothers Ludovic Rodo Pissarro and Georges Manzana-Pissarro. The works of this period are strongly influenced by Impressionism. From these beginnings, only a dozen paintings have survived, mostly landscapes.

In 1908, two events permanently marked the work of Borgeaud. The first was a series of paintings of interiors and the second was his discovery of Brittany. This area attracted artists working in Paris regularly since the nineteenth century because of the tradition, low cost, picturesque geography, and variable weather conditions.

After brief stops in Pont-Aven and Locquirec in 1908, Borgeaud moved in 1909 to Rochefort-en-Terre in the Morbihan. It is in this locality he created two of his most famous series, one in the town hall and the other in the corner drugstore, both which earned him great success in the Paris salon of Independents. They launched his career.

In Rochefort-en-Terre, Borgeaud met Madeleine Gascoin, twenty-eight years his junior, whom he married in 1923. Meanwhile, he moved to another village in Brittany, Le Faouët, also known for its colony painters. He preferred anonymous places like the station and always painted more private interiors, while keeping a special affection for inn scenes. The paintings he produced during the three years he spent in Faouët, between early 1920 and late 1922, are considered the height of his œuvre. Marius Borgeaud moved the following year to Audierne. Health problems overtook him there in 1924. He returned to Paris, where he died in his apartment at 43 rue Lamarck, on 16 July 1924.

== Work ==
Most of Borgeaud's 300 existing oil paintings are landscapes and interior scenes. However, fifteen are portraits of people, the most famous being Coco Chanel.

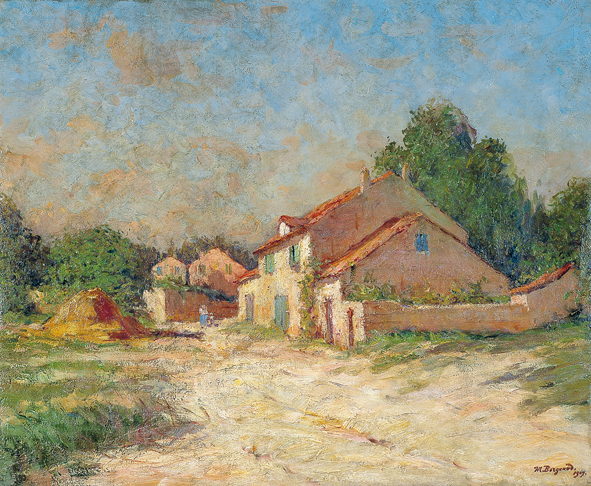
Vieilles maisons, effet de soleil
(1907)

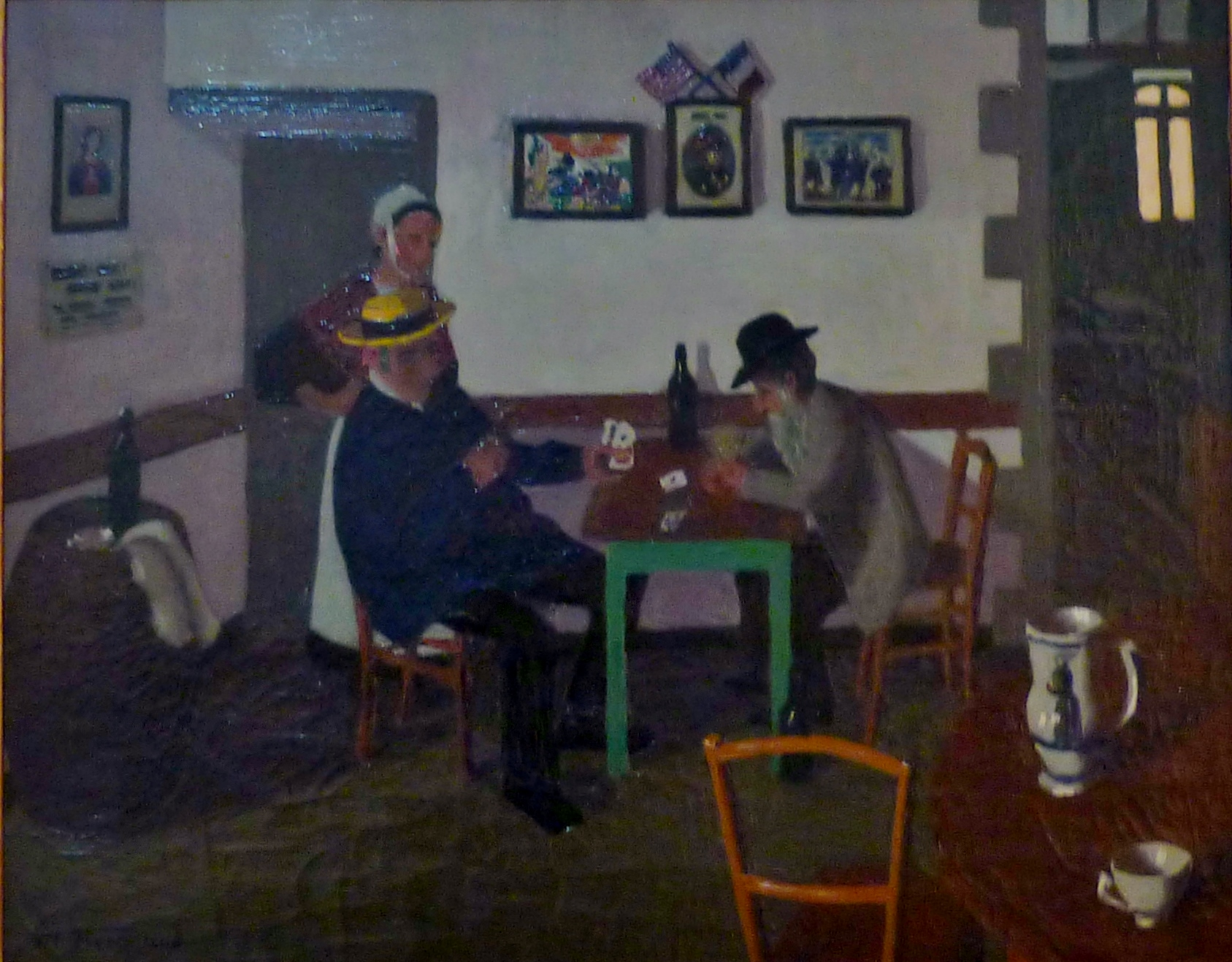
Les joueurs de cartes (1917)

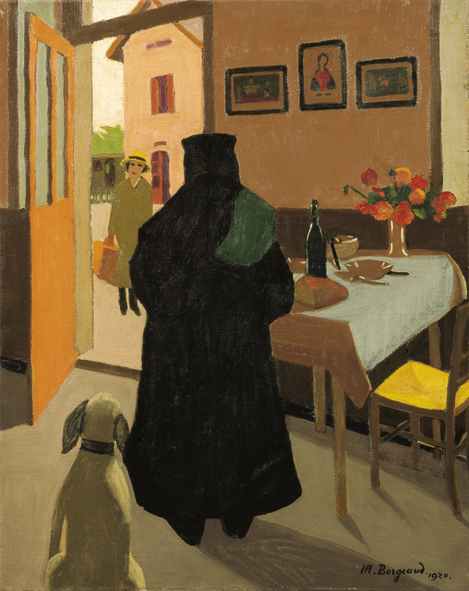
L'arrivée (1920)

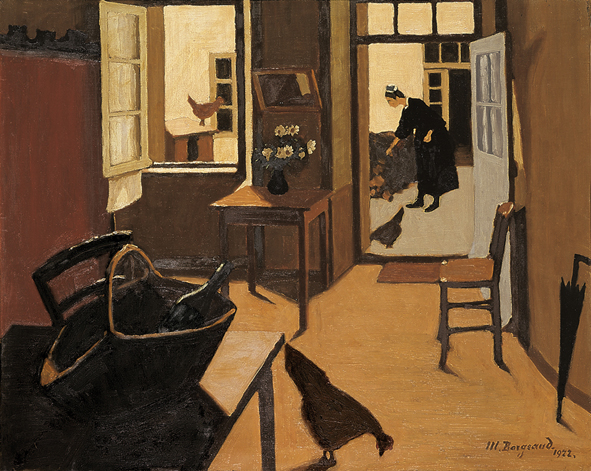
La bretonne et ses poules (1922)

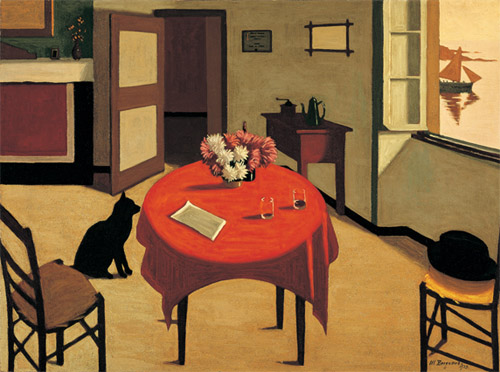
Intérieur aux deux verres (1923)

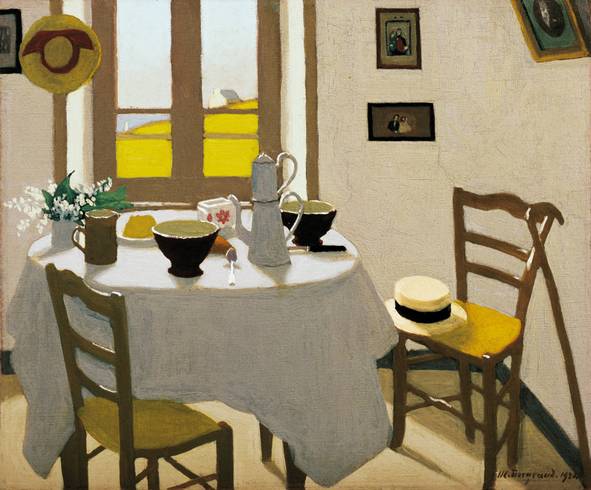
La chambre blanche (1924)
