= Jean Puy =

French painter

Jean Puy, 1905, Flânerie sous les pins, oil on canvas, 81 x 115 cm, Musée Paul-Dini de Villefranche-sur-Saône. Exhibited at the 1905 Salon d'Automne

Harfleur, 1920, oil on canvas, 54.3 x 65.3 cm, Courtauld Institute of Art, London

Jean Puy (French pronunciation: [ʒɑ̃ pɥi]; 8 November 1876 in Roanne, Loire – 6 March 1960 in Roanne) was a French Fauvist artist.

== Life and work ==
He studied architecture at the École nationale des beaux-arts de Lyon and painting with Jean-Paul Laurens at l'Académie Julian between 1897 and 1898. He met Henri Matisse and other like-minded artists when he transferred to the l'Académie Carrière in 1899. He exhibited his work in 1901, then in an Impressionist style, at the Salon des Indépendants; later, as a Fauvist, he exhibited at the 1905 Salon d'Automne.

L'Illustration related the Salon d'Automne "scandal" and published reproductions of several paintings dubbed Fauve, among which Jean Puy's Flânerie sous les pins (Strolling through pine woods), together with Louis Vauxcelles' comment: "Mr. Puy, whose nude at the seashore reminds us of Cézanne's wide schematism, is presenting outdoor scenes where the volumes of things and beings are strongly established."

Colors! Engaging, captivating, bewitching, coaxing, entrancing, ravishing colors! It seems we'll never stop feasting our eyes on them… (Jean Puy)
