= Fernand Cormon =

French painter (1845–1924)

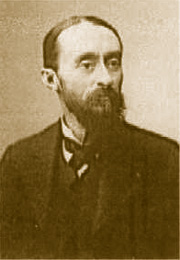
- Fernand Cormon
- Born: Fernand Anne-Piestre Cormon; 24 December 1845; Paris, France
- Died: 20 March 1924 (aged 78); Paris, France
- Education: Jean-François Portaels in Brussels; Alexandre Cabanel and Eugène Fromentin in Paris
- Movement: Orientalist

Fernand Cormon (French pronunciation: [fɛʁnɑ̃ kɔʁmɔ̃]; 24 December 1845 – 20 March 1924) was a French painter born in Paris. He became a pupil of Alexandre Cabanel, Eugène Fromentin, and Jean-François Portaels, and one of the leading historical painters of modern France.

== Biography ==
His father was the playwright Eugène Cormon. His mother was Charlotte Furais, the actress.

At an early age he attracted attention for the perceived sensationalism in his art, although for a time his powerful brush dwelled with particular delight on scenes of bloodshed, such as the Murder in the Seraglio (1868) and the Death of Ravana, King of Lanka at the Toulouse Museum. The Musée d'Orsay has his Cain fleeing before Jehovah's Curse; and for the Mairie of the fourth arrondissement of Paris he executed in grisaille a series of panels: Birth, Death, Marriage, War, etc. A Chiefs Funeral, and a series of large paintings for the Museum of natural history in Paris with themes from the Stone Age, occupied him for several years. He was appointed to the Legion of Honor in 1880. Subsequently he also devoted himself to portraiture such as Young African Woman.

Being well-accepted at the annual Salon, he also ran an art school, the Atelier Cormon in the 1880s where he tried to guide his students to create paintings which would be accepted by the Salon's jury. Among his students with whom he was unsuccessful on this point were, for instance: Henri de Toulouse-Lautrec, Louis Anquetin, Eugène Boch, Paul Tampier, Émile Bernard and Vincent van Gogh. Other students included Alphonse Osbert, Marius Borgeaud, Theodor Pallady, Chaïm Soutine, Louis Muraton, Boris Schatz who later founded the Bezalel art Scholl in Jerusalem, and the Australian painter John Russell.

In 1924, he was run over by a taxi outside his studio, and is barely remembered today save as the teacher of pupils more illustrious than himself.

== Selected paintings ==
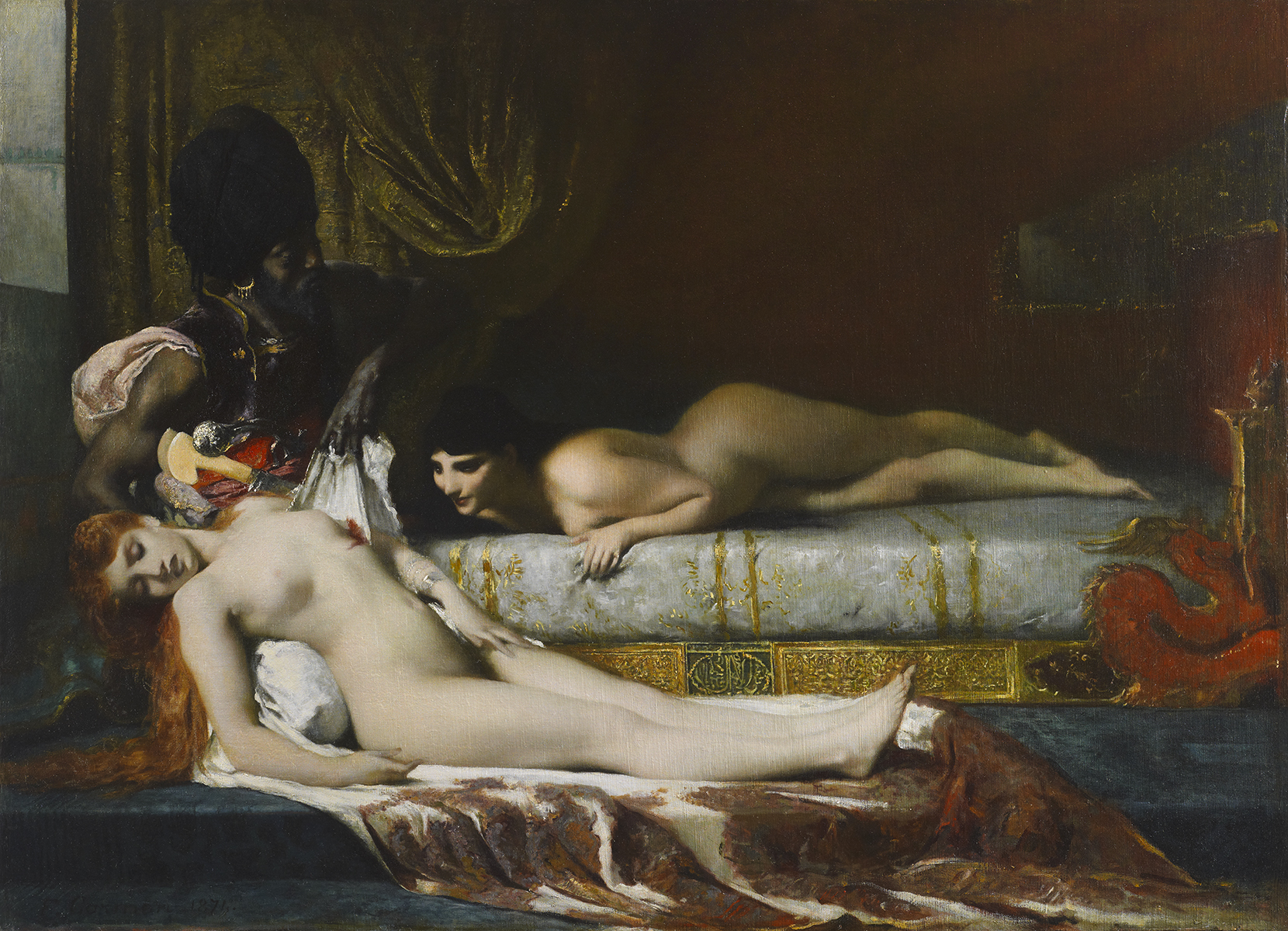
Murder in the Seraglio, (1874)

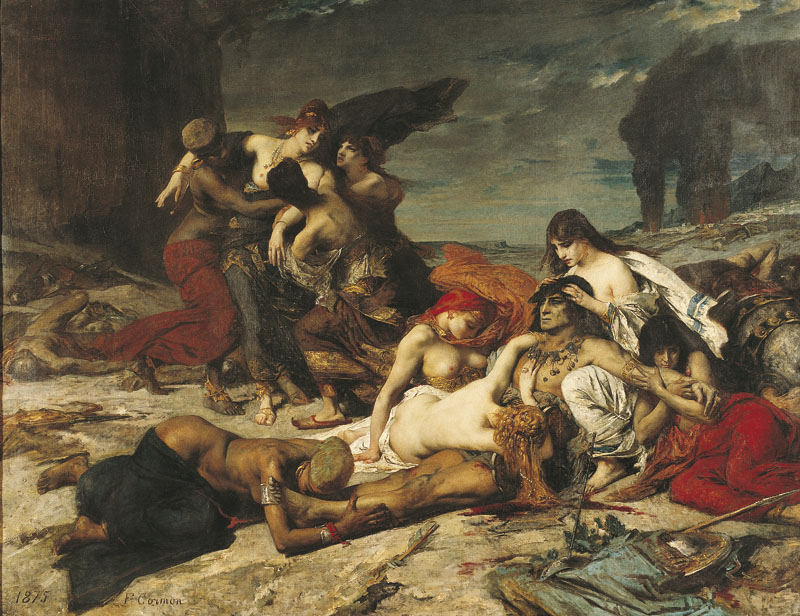
The Death of Ravana,
King of Lanka (1875)

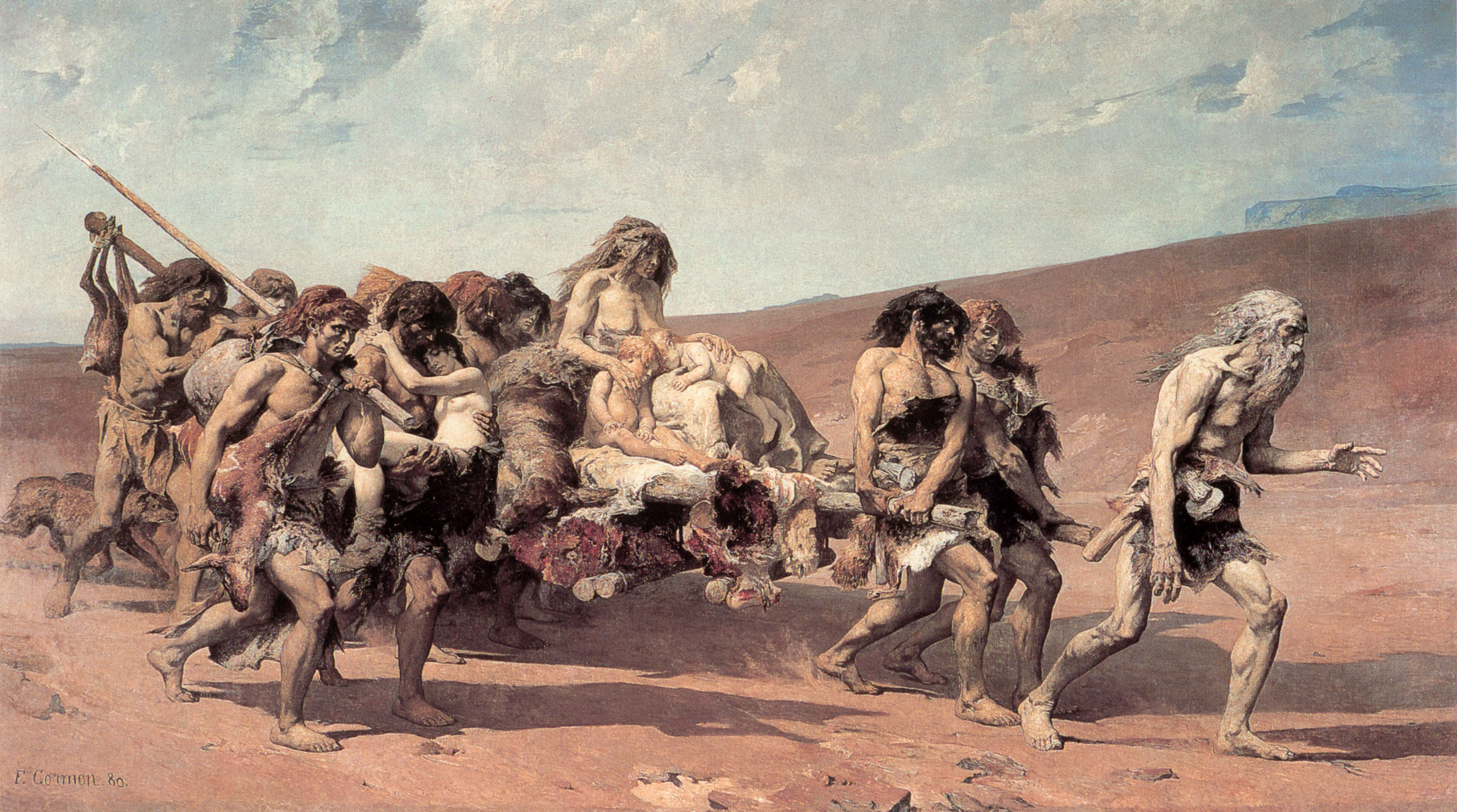
Cain fleeing before
Jehovah's Curse (1880)

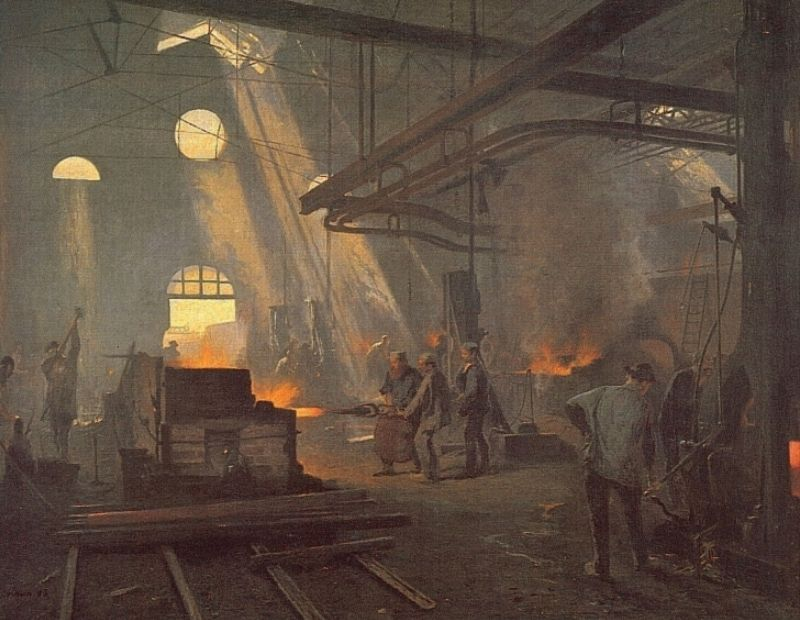
A Forge (1894)

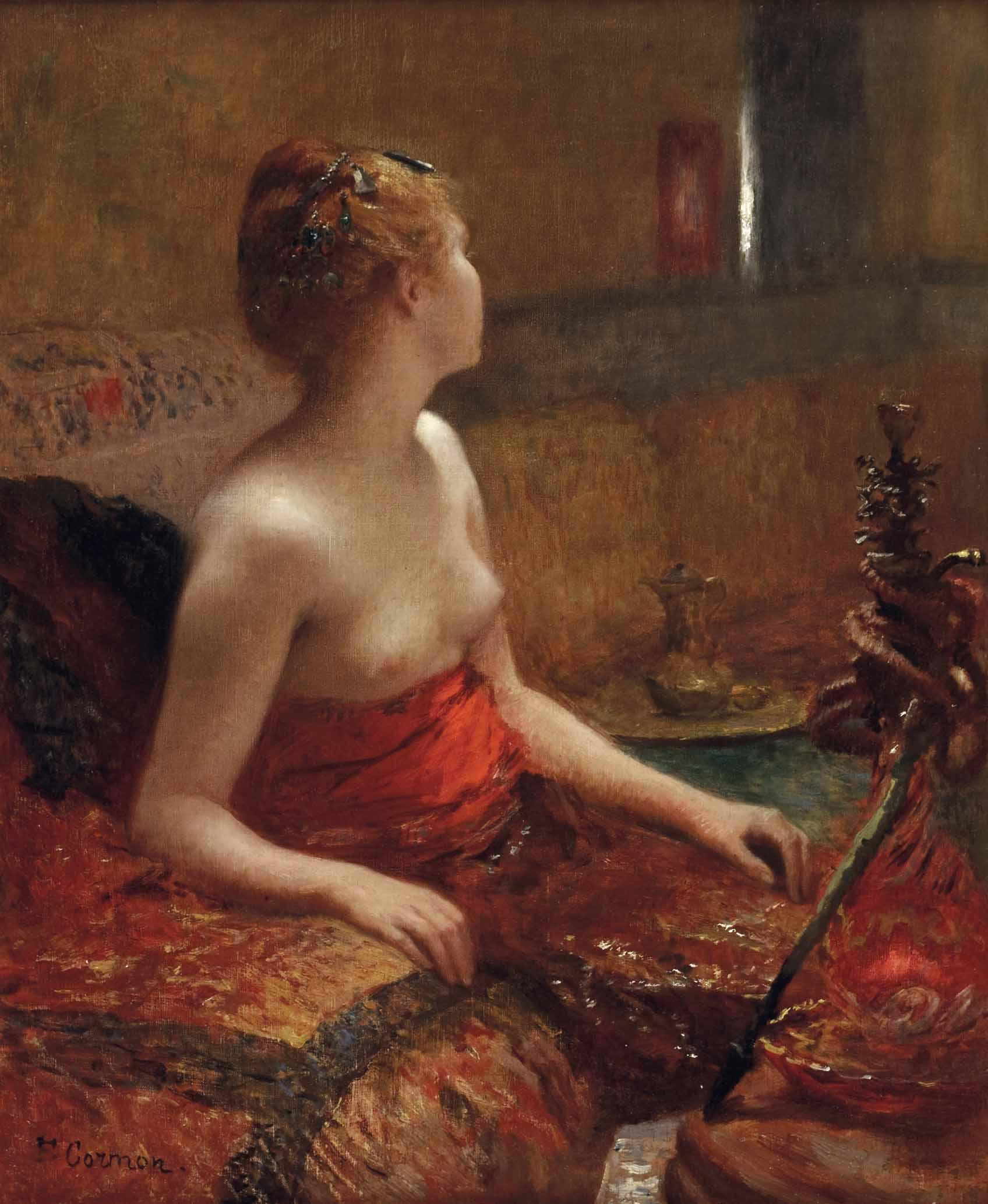
Anticipation (date unknown)

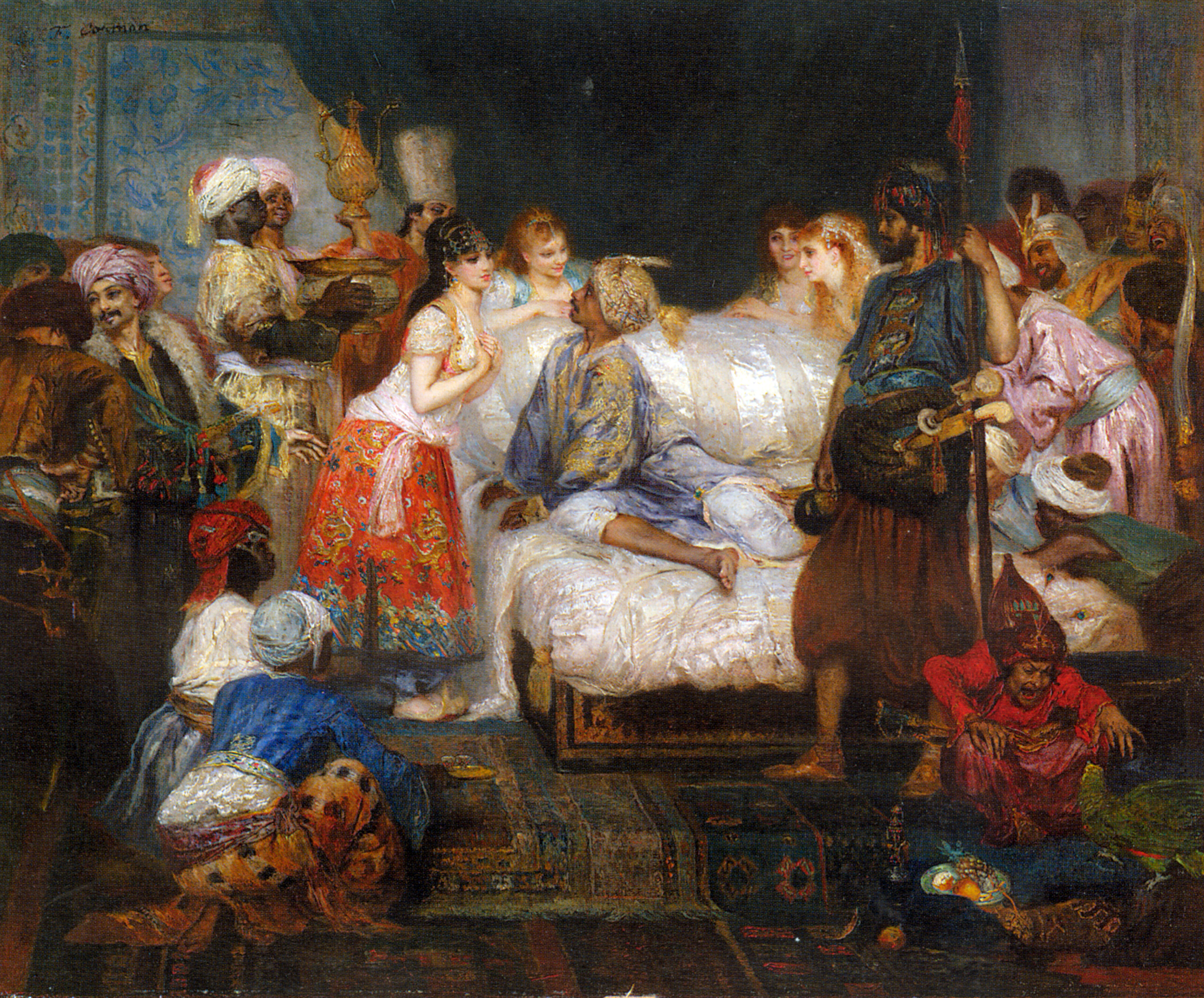
A Harem (c.1877)

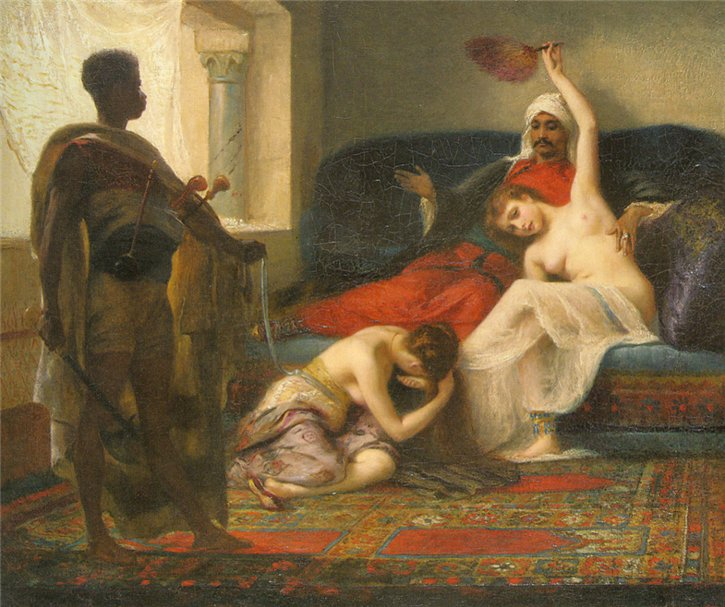
The Deposed Favorite
(date unknown)

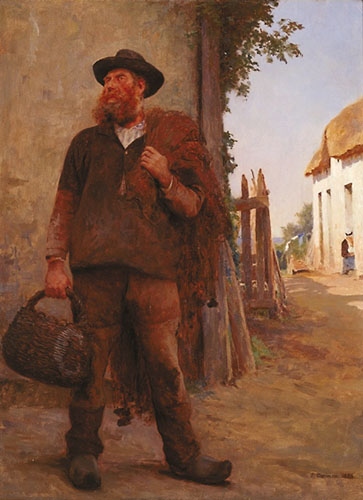
Going Fishing (1888)

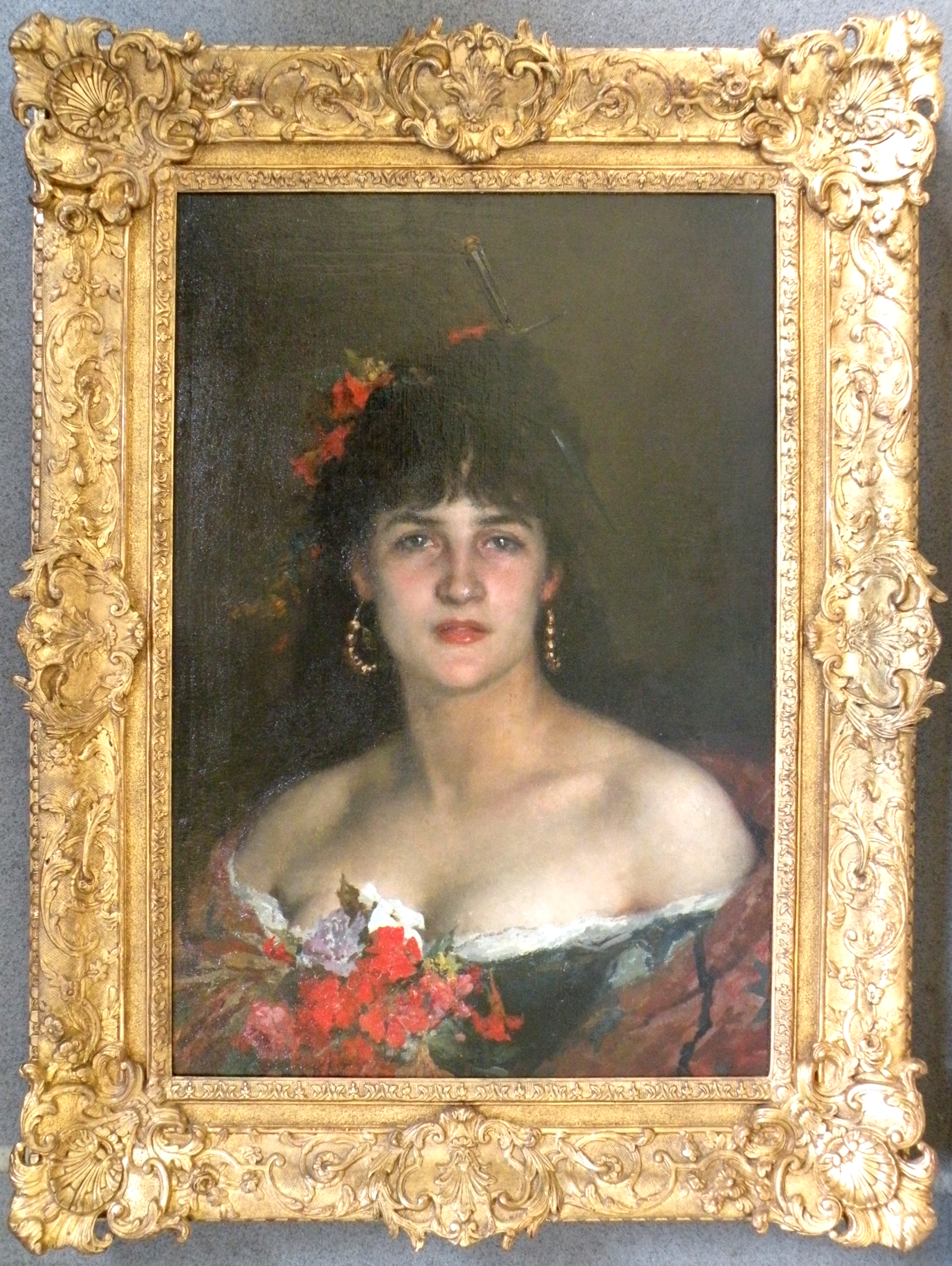
Gitane (1897)
