= Aline Atherton-Smith =

Aline Sybil Atherton-Smith
- Born: 13 November 1875; Ryde, Isle of Wight, England
- Died: 1956 (aged 80–81)
- Occupations: International relief worker, Quaker, painter and writer
- Spouse: David Atherton-Smith

Aline Sybil Atherton-Smith (13 November 1875 – 1956) was an English born Quaker, who worked as an International refugee relief worker and writer, focused initially with duties for the British Red Cross, followed by humanitarian aid in France, and subsequently in Central Europe with the Friends' War Victims Relief Committee. She was a member of the Friends Council for International Service. As an activist for peaceful causes, she assisted displaced persons, and aided the Serbs in France in the aftermath of First World War. In 1940, her name appeared on the Nazis' most wanted list drawn up prior to their intended invasion of Britain (published online as Hitler's Black Book by Forces War Records).

== Early life ==
Born Aline Sybil Bridge in 1875 in Ryde, Isle of Wight into a wealthy military family; the daughter of a retired Colonel; William Albert Bridge (1841-1903) and Sybil Louisa Napier (1848-1904). By 1901, the family resided in Hedge End, moving on to West End, Hampshire. Articles refer to her as being a Quaker all her life.

Bridge was an accomplished painter, specialising in figurative subjects, and moved to France sometime after the death of her mother. Bridge exhibited her art in Paris, Brussels and Amsterdam between 1912 and 1914.

== World War I ==
Unlike fellow artist Hilda May Gordon, she did not join the Voluntary Aid Detachment; following the outbreak of hostilities of World War I; then aged 38, and now married to a fellow painter, David Atherton-Smith and residing in France, she worked for the Red Cross, under the auspices of Robert Cecil, 1st Viscount Cecil of Chelwood, who went on to become one of the architects of the League of Nations.

Atherton-Smith also volunteered as an orderly in a newly built Parisian hotel which served as a military field hospital, where she assisted Flora Murray (chief physician) and Louisa Garrett Anderson (chief surgeon). Her duties involved collecting X-ray apparatus, catheters and other supplies from either British and French Army medical stores, or the train station, or travel by bike to the Scottish Women's Hospital at Royaumont. She subsequently worked for the Bureau for Reconstruction and Re-education, American Red Cross in Paris.

== Humanitarian work ==
At the end of the hostilities, she began working with victims of forced migration, particularly the Serbian refugees in Marseille, with Florence Mary Barrow working with the French Red Cross. In 1918 she was commended for her war relief service, along with Dr. Hilda Clark. She remained in continental Europe after a cessation of hostilities in 1918, continuing her humanitarian aid work.

A year later, now as a senior refugee relief worker, she relocated to Austria to assist in dealing with the humanitarian catastrophe that was building up in Vienna, following Dr. Clark, where she chose to remain for many years. In the early 1920s, she was appointed Head of the Department for Land Settlements at the Anglo-American Quaker mission in Vienna. Her husband was the Deputy Head of the European Student Relief of the World’s Student Christian Federation.

Atherton-Smith soon became known within the relief agency community as the "foster mother" of the Wolfersberg settlement project in Penzing, the 14th district of Vienna. Widely respected in the communities she helped; and overseas where the Society of Friends replicated her model, inspired by a reformist social movement. Her writings are held within a number of libraries around the world, with her efforts at the time being also reported in The Times of London during 1924. Her husband was also helping educate poor students in Vienna during this period. She appears in the American Friends Service Committee Newsletter of 1926.

In terms of legacy, her main life project was dedicated to the task of building a new housing estate on Wolfersberg mountain, a rural settlement overlooking Vienna. The settlements occupants included displaced persons from the former Austro-Hungarian Empire. Known as a Quaker settlement, it consisted of roughly 60 homes; a cooperative building and a community garden for growing food plants. Wolfersberg was officially run in the form of an association, under her directorship; and solely funded by the Quaker charitable donations since inception in 1922, until Anschluss during March 1938, when the settlement association was abruptly disbanded.

At the age of 60, Atherton-Smith arrived in Southampton, in 1936 on board a passenger vessel originating from Buenos Aires, and her profession is recorded as a painter and still living overseas. It is unknown whether she boarded from Europe or had spent time in South America.

== Return to France ==
A once time member of the Anglo-German Fellowship, Atherton-Smith left Vienna after annexation by the German Reich during March 1938 to France. How she departed Vienna is unknown, since the authorities in the city now classified Atherton-Smith as an enemy of the German Reich, due to her being an active pacifist and having left leaning views. During the spring of 1940, Atherton-Smith was placed on the special "wanted list GB", compiled by the Reich Security Main Office, a directory of people to be particularly targeted in their anticipated invasion and occupation of the United Kingdom. This priority list by the Nazi regime identified who was to be immediately arrested by the Einsatzgruppen, and contained 2,820 names of people, including British nationals and European exiles. Such was her notoriety, in terms of Communist and Marxist sympathies, that she was on a second special list.

The Reich Security Main Office records Atherton-Smith as last seen in Chantrya at the age of 70. It is not known where or what is Chantrya. Her fate during / or after World War II was unknown, and it was previously assumed that she was captured and killed in German-occupied Europe; possibly Yugoslavia. However researchers have recently identified correspondence with art historian, Mary Berenson who resided in Florence, suggesting that she likely exited the country after annexation, and made her way to Italy. The fact that she made it into the Nazi most wanted list, the Black Book, suggests the Reich knew her whereabouts; that she now resided in England. Furthermore, an Aline S.A. Smith death registration, representative of her exact age, having taken place in 1956 within the district of Maidenhead, Berkshire.

== Later life ==
Documents from the British National Archives suggest that Atherton-Smith was in Paris during the Second World War. In 1945, the British Ministry of Internal Affairs, officially known as the "Home Office", opened an investigation against Atherton-Smith, on suspicion of her having made anti-British statements during the German occupation of Paris, thereby suggesting that in 1945, at the age of 70, she had resided in Paris at some time during the German military administration of occupied France.

== Legacy ==
Her correspondence with Frances Hodgkins, a New Zealand artist, whilst living in Paris during World War I, has been preserved by the Frances Hodgkins Institute, and various other libraries across the globe. Her correspondence with Mary Berenson, prior and during World War II has been preserved by the Hollis Archives of Harvard University.

== Publications ==
- Atherton-Smith, A. S. - The Austrian Land Settlements: A Solution of the Housing Problem, 1926
