= The Citadel of Tangier =

1913 painting by Albert Marquet

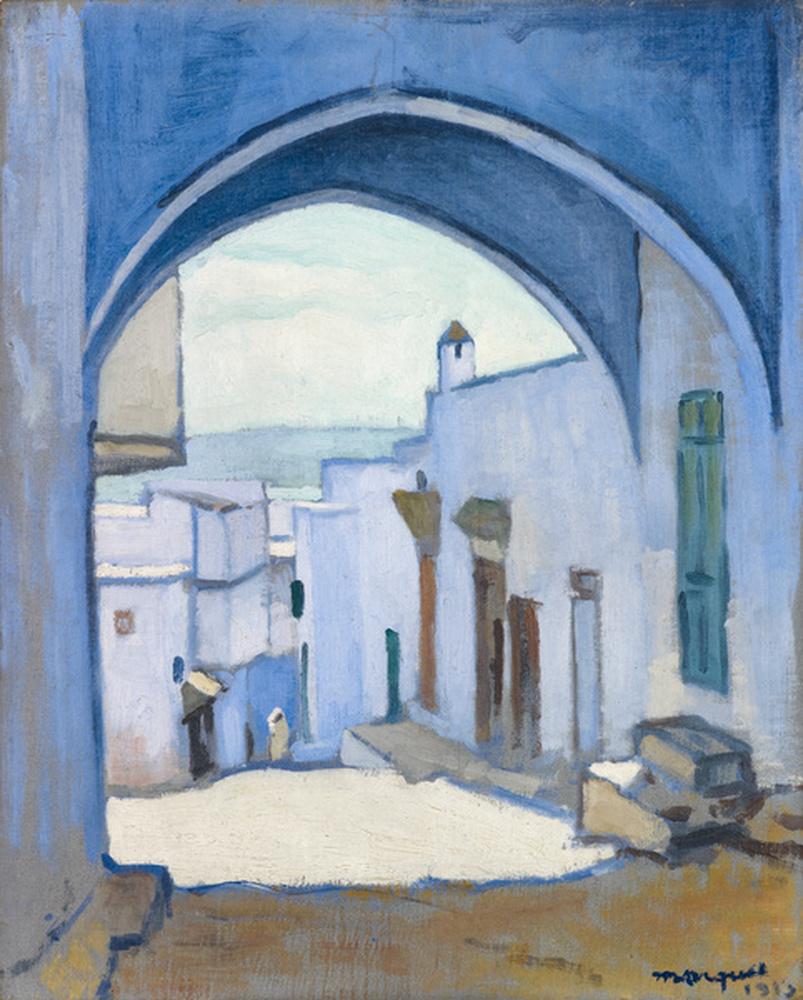
The Citadel of Tangier (1913) by Albert Marquet

The Citadel of Tangier is a 1913 painting by French artist Albert Marquet, using oils on canvas glued to a card background. It is held in the Museum of Grenoble.

It depicts a view from an arch in Tangiers, then in French Morocco, with the local achitecture and the sea visible.
