= David Atherton-Smith =

Quaker aid worker and teacher

- Born: 20 July 1871; Glasgow
- Died: 1958; Lewisham
- Occupations: International relief worker, Quaker and artist
- Spouses: Nanette Dalmas (m. 1903; div. 1913); Aline Atherton-Smith

David Atherton-Smith (20 July 1871 - 1958) was a Scottish born Quaker, a refugee relief worker and a professional vocalist. During World War I, he focused on humanitarian aid in France, initially for the French Red Cross, transferring to the American Red Cross as an A.R.C. Captain, being closely involved on the welfare and rehabilitation of injured French soldiers. His attentions were then diverted to aiding displaced persons after World War I. During 1919 he relocated to Central Europe with the Friends' War Victims Relief Committee. In 1920, he was appointed Deputy Head of the European Student Relief of the World’s Student Christian Federation. As a painter he exhibited his art in Europe.

== Early life and artistic career ==
Atherton-Smith was born on 20 July 1871 in Glasgow; the son of James Smith, a bow manufacturer. He became a professional vocalist or Vocal coach and moved to England.

At the turn of the century he was a regular performer at musical events in London, making his first appearance at Queen's Hall on 21 March 1898. In January 1902 he performed at the annual Robert Burns event at Queen's Hall, under patronage of Princess Louise, Duchess of Argyll. In November of that year, he performed with the accomplished American pianist Lucie Mawson at the newly established Bechstein Hall, and a week later at the Steinway Hall, in London.

At the age of 32, he resided in Westbourne Square, London, amongst likeminded people; fellow artists and intellectuals. He began courting Anna "Naunette" Dalmas (1868-1944), a few years his senior of independent means; a wealthy American musician of French extraction, from Philadelphia, who was associated with the Arts and Crafts movement and moved within social circles that include Charles Robert Ashbee. Naunette or Nanette was the younger sister of Philip Dalmas, a charismatic and gifted diletante pianist and composer, who was already living in London and Paris from remittances from his country of birth. Atherton-Smith married Naunette at St James's Church, Paddington on 28 July 1903. Their marriage was an unhappy one, of adultery and desertion of the part on Atherton-Smith; when in September 1908, he abruptly abandoned Naunette following the birth of their young child, Nigel Dalmas Atherton Macalister-Smith (1907-1993). He chose not to provide any financial support to his wife and infant, and she relocated to East Grinstead. Documents from the British National Archives indicate that he fled to France whilst she remained in England. These records were closed to the public for 102 years from Decree nisi, which may indicate extenuating circumstances surrounding paternity of the offspring.

Between 1912 and 1915 his impressionist and modern paintings were exhibited at the Walker Art Gallery in Liverpool, as well as at the Royal Scottish Academy. He embraced the impressionist style of painting, and immersed himself into his new life. He set up a Parisienne studio, and let it out to fund his lengthy stays in Étaples, a small town situated on the northern coast of France where he painted landscape scenes.

He was still legally married when he returned briefly to London with a new female companion, staying in a hotel near Charing Cross. His infidelity (now proven and likely intentional), together with his unwillingness to return to his wife, was all used as evidence when his wife petitioned for a divorce. He journeyed throughout France and to Italy, painting scenes of Venice and French North Africa in the French impressionist style that he had adopted.

He exhibited "On the Beach" at the Salon d'Automne in 1920.

== Humanitarian work (1914-onwards) ==
During the First World War, Atherton-Smith worked for the French Red Cross as an administrator. His second wife, Aline, worked for the Red Cross in France, under the auspices of Robert Cecil, 1st Viscount Cecil of Chelwood. Aline volunteered as an orderly in a newly built Parisian hotel, which served as a military field hospital, where she assisted Flora Murray (chief physician) and Louisa Garrett Anderson (chief surgeon), and collecting supplies from either British and French Army medical stores, and deliver to the Scottish Women's Hospital at Royaumont.

Atherton-Smith remained in continental Europe after a cessation of hostilities in 1918, continuing his humanitarian aid work as a Captain in the American Red Cross.

He was appointed Deputy Head of the European Student Relief of the World’s Student Christian Federation founded in Vienna in 1920, while his wife was appointed Head of the Department for Land Settlements at the Anglo-American Quaker mission in Vienna.

Atherton-Smith was commended in the Austrian capital for his efforts in educating poor students in Vienna. In October 1922, the German student body of the University of Vienna proposed that Atherton-Smith to receive an award from the University by stating:

"The German student body of the University of Vienna takes the liberty of addressing the request to the high academic senate of Dr. Atherton Smith, the deputy head of the European Student Aid, on the occasion of his departure from the Economic Aid and the European Student Aid for his great services to the welfare institutions of the student body as well as Mr. Donald Grant in his time with an award from the ALMAE MATRIS RUDOLFINAE."

Based on the approval of the members of the Decorations Committee, rector Karl Diener applied to the Senate for the award of the University of Vienna's golden medal of honor, which was approved by Senate resolution of 27 October 1922.

In a letter dated 13 November 1922, Atherton-Smith expressed his thanks for the honour:

"Although I feel altogether unworthy of such a distinction I shall nevertheless be proud to regard it always as a cherished remembrance of one of the happiest experiences of my life - namely, of my work amongst Austrian students."

The award was presented on 17 November 1922 in the rectorate's office. Invitations were sent both to the German student body at the University of Vienna, which had initiated the award, and to the Society of Friends to attend the award ceremony.

== Later life ==
Atherton-Smith's wife had been identified as an enemy of the German Reich, due to her being an active pacifist and having left leaning views. During the spring of 1940, she was placed on the special "wanted list GB", compiled by the Reich Security Main Office, a directory of people to be particularly targeted in their anticipated invasion and occupation of the United Kingdom. Such was his wife’s notoriety, in terms of Communist and Marxist sympathies, that she was on a second special list.

After residing in France he returned to London during his final years. He died in South London during 1958. His death being recorded in the District of Lewisham, having survived his second wife by two years, whose death was registered in Berkshire.
