= Albert Marquet =

French painter, from the Fauvist movement

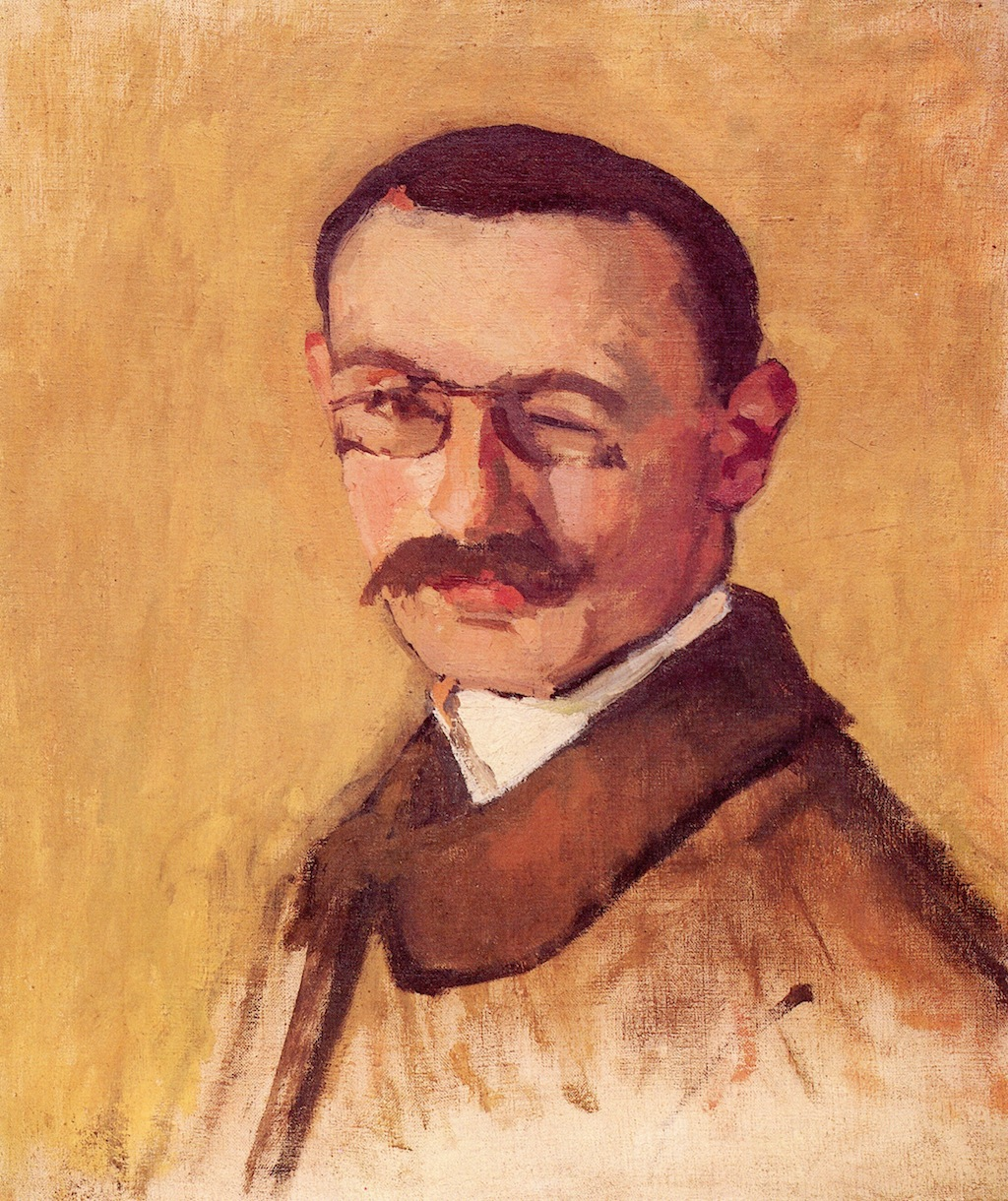
- Self-portrait, 1904
- Born: Pierre-Albert Marquet; 27 March 1875; Bordeaux, Gironde, France
- Died: 14 June 1947 (aged 72); La Frette-sur-Seine, Val-d'Oise, France
- Education: École des Arts Décoratifs, École des Beaux-Arts, Gustave Moreau
- Known for: Painting
- Movement: Fauvism

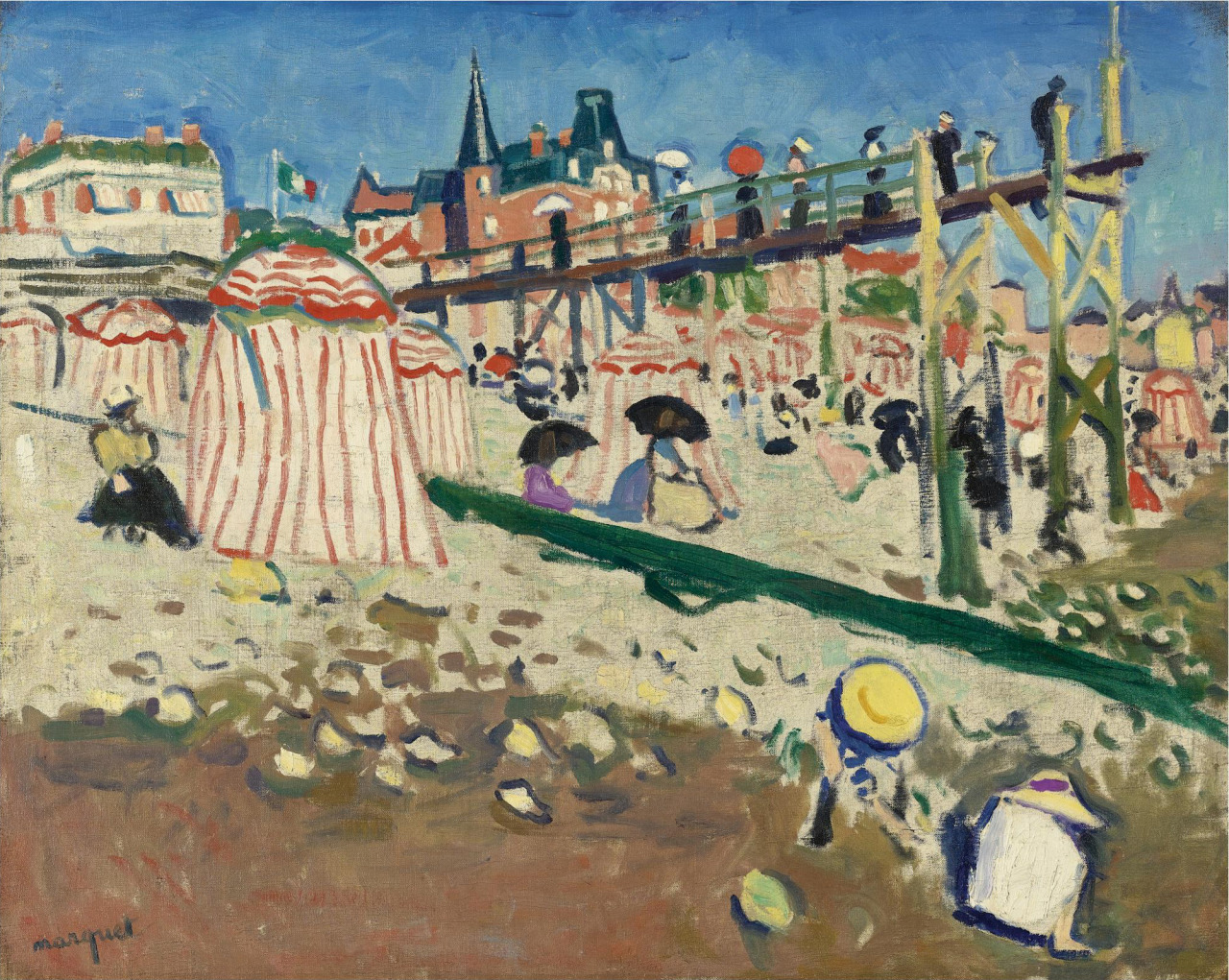
Marquet, 1906, Fécamp (The Beach at Sainte-Adresse), oil on canvas, 64.5 x 80 cm

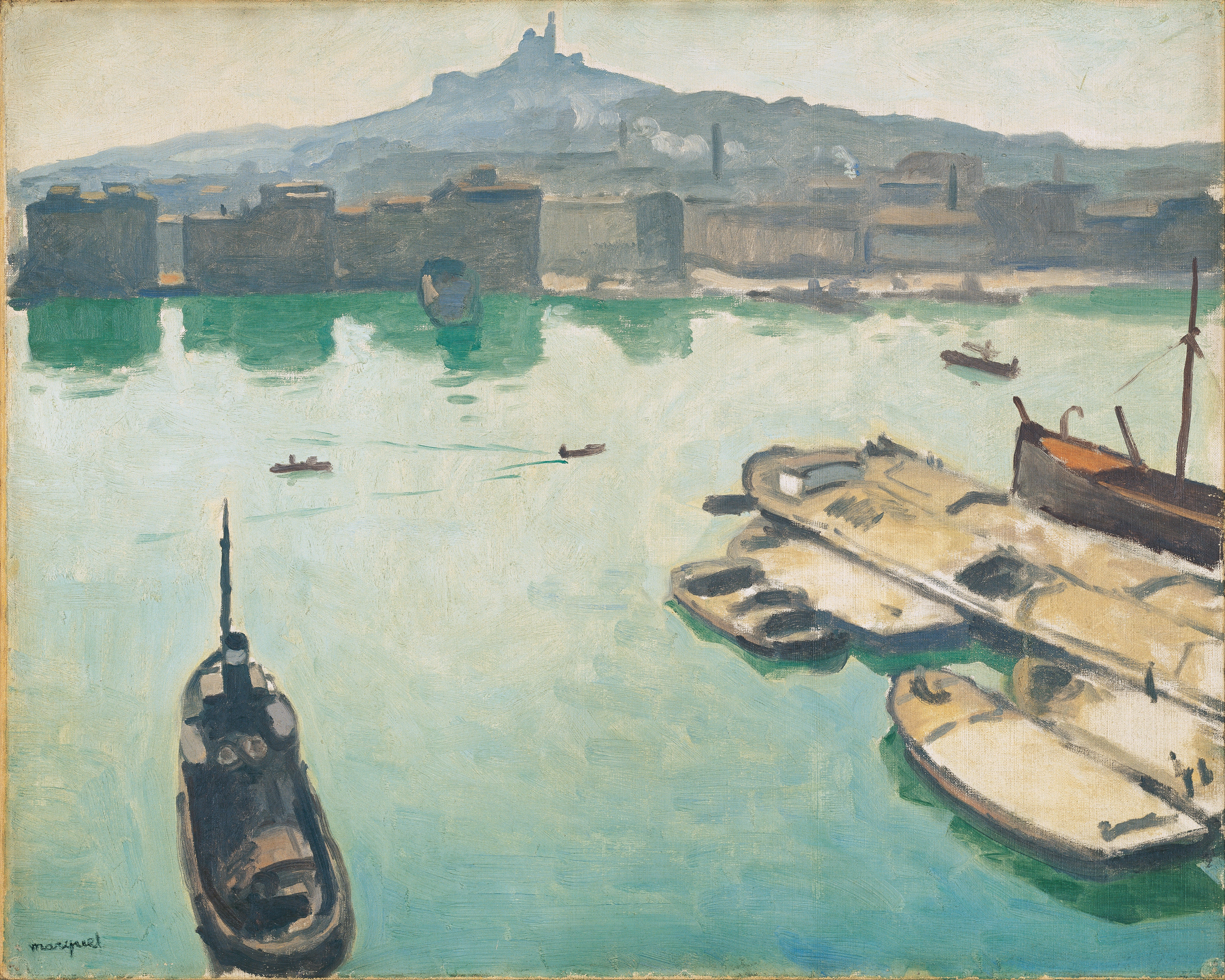
Marquet, 1916, Port of Marseilles, oil on canvas, 65 x 81 cm, Ohara Museum of Art

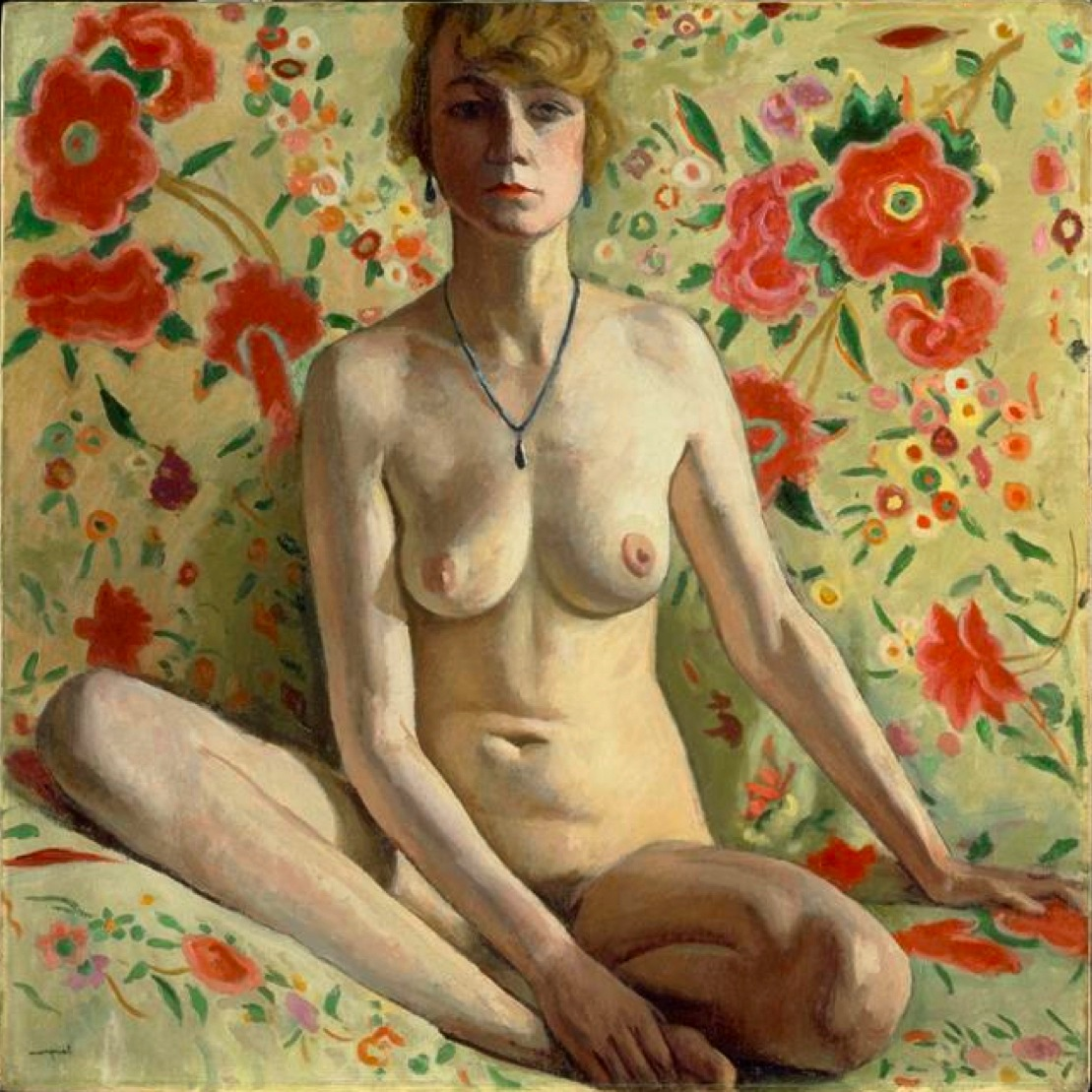
Albert Marquet, 1919, La femme blonde (Femme blonde sur un fond de châle espagnol), oil on canvas, 98.5 x 98.5 cm, Musée National d'Art Moderne, Centre Georges Pompidou, Paris

Albert Marquet (French pronunciation: [albɛʁ maʁkɛ]; 27 March 1875 – 14 June 1947) was a French painter. He initially was one of the Fauve painters and a lifelong friend of Henri Matisse. Marquet subsequently painted in a more impressionist style, primarily landscapes, but also several portraits and, between 1910 and 1914, several female nude paintings.

== Life and work ==
Marquet was born in 1875 in Bordeaux. In 1890 he moved to Paris to attend the École des Arts Décoratifs, where he met Henri Matisse. They were roommates for a time, and they influenced each other's work. Marquet began studies in 1892 at the École des Beaux-Arts under Gustave Moreau, a symbolist artist who was a follower of the Romantic tradition of Eugène Delacroix.

In these years, Marquet exhibited paintings at the Salon des Indépendants. Although he did not sell many paintings, the artistic community of Paris became aware of his work. His early compositions were characterised by a Fauvist approach, in which he had a fine control of the drawing and responded to light, not only by intensifying the strongest tones, but also by seeing the weaker ones in coloristic terms. Marquet and Matisse were already painting together in pure colors as far back as 1898 in the Arcueil and at the Luxembourg Gardens in what was later to be called the Fauve style.

In 1905 he exhibited at the Salon d'Automne where his paintings were put together with those of Henri Matisse, Maurice de Vlaminck, André Derain, Othon Friesz, Georges Rouault, Raoul Dufy, Henri Manguin, Georges Braque, Louis Valtat, Georges Dufrénoy and Jean Puy. He became a lifelong friend of Matisse.

Dismayed by the intense coloration in these paintings, critics reacted by naming the artists the "Fauves", i.e. the wild beasts. Although Marquet painted with the fauves for years, he used less bright and violent colors than the others, and emphasized less intense tones made by mixing complementaries, thus always as colors and never as grays.

Marquet subsequently painted in a more naturalistic style, primarily landscapes.

At the end of 1907, he stayed in Paris and dedicated himself, together with Matisse, to a series of city views. The fundamental difference between the two is that while Matisse used strong colors, Marquet favored grayed yellows, greyed violets or blues. Black was usually used as a violent contrast to light colors for such forms as bare tree trunks or calligraphically drawn people contrasted with very light, often yellow or orange streets and sidewalks. Another difference is that Marquet used an approximation of traditional perspective, although his colors and compositions constantly referred to the rectangle and cut its plane with their calligraphy.

From 1907 to his death, Marquet alternated between working in his studio in Paris and many parts of the European coast and in North Africa. He was most involved with Algeria and Algiers and with Tunisia. In his voyages he painted the sea and ships, but also the lights and animated life of the city, especially cities on the waterfront, like Algiers and The Citadel of Tangier.

Among European cities Marquet remained impressed particularly with Naples and Venice where he painted the sea and boats, accenting the light over water. He adopted a technique nothing like the Impressionists', painting water as a large area of simple tone which held the plane of the water surface without illusionistic perspective, from which the ships arise into a different plane. His views of the lagoon in Venice do this very economically. The water stays at a right angle to the picture plane and the large ships float with ease, with their reflections exactly the correct tone to project the required space. His color is much like Matisse of the 1920s, here. His contrasts of vivid colors describe the waves of the sea with simple drawing which accompany the exactly observed color tones, giving a scene of placid movement. The human figures are much simplified, calligraphically drawn in a way related to Japanese Shijo style work. Matisse said, "When I look at Hokusai, I think of Marquet—and vice versa ... I don't mean imitation of Hokusai, I mean similarity with him".

During his voyages to Germany and Sweden, he painted the subjects he usually preferred: river and sea views, ports and ships, but also cityscapes. Over the course of his career he often returned to the same subjects, even years later, recording subtle differences in the light. He painted a few portraits, and between 1910 and 1914 he painted a series of nudes in whorehouses, and prepared the illustration of a work on lesbian lovers. But he is best known for his many landscapes.

Unlike Matisse, there are no obvious periods of change in his work. As one of Matisse's closest friends, they discussed each other's work. Marquet's death was unexpected and sudden from a gall bladder attack and subsequently discovered cancer, for which at that time there was no therapy. He died in La Frette-sur-Seine, on 14 June 1947.

== Legacy ==
The English painter John McLean is among those who consider that "his feeling for colour, the lightness or darkness and saturation of it, its weight, is nothing less than astounding".

Marquet was revered by the American painters Leland Bell and his wife Louisa Matthiasdottir. He was also revered by Bell's contemporaries Al Kresch and Gabriel Laderman. Since both Bell and Laderman were teachers in several American art schools, they have had an influence on younger American figurative artists and their appreciation of Marquet.

== Illustrations ==
- Jean Cocteau, Bertrand Guégan (1892–1943); L'almanach de Cocagne pour l'an 1920–1922, Dédié aux vrais Gourmands Et aux Francs Buveurs

== Gallery ==
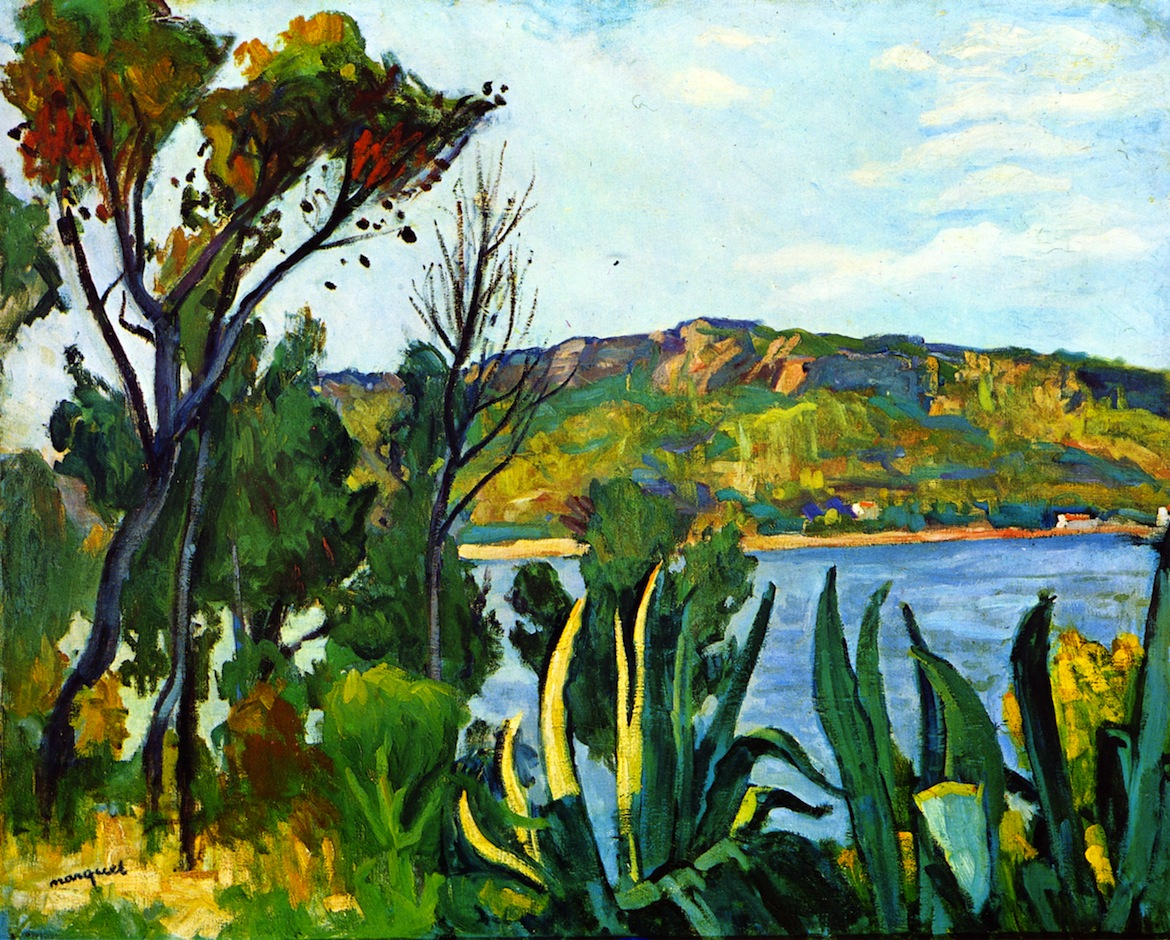
View of Agay, 1905, Musée National d'Art Moderne

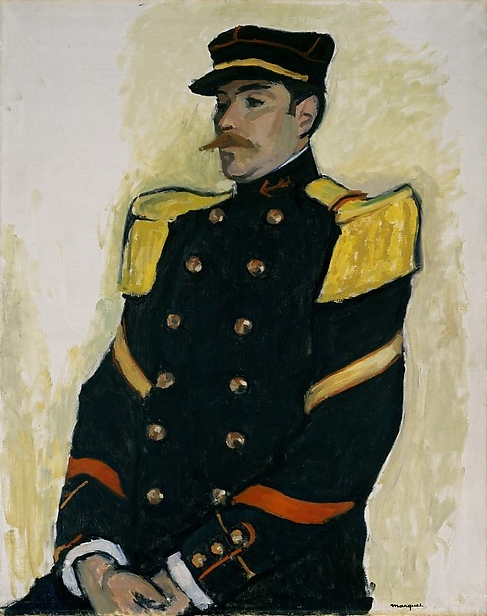
Sergeant of the Colonial Regiment c. 1906–1907, Metropolitan Museum of Art

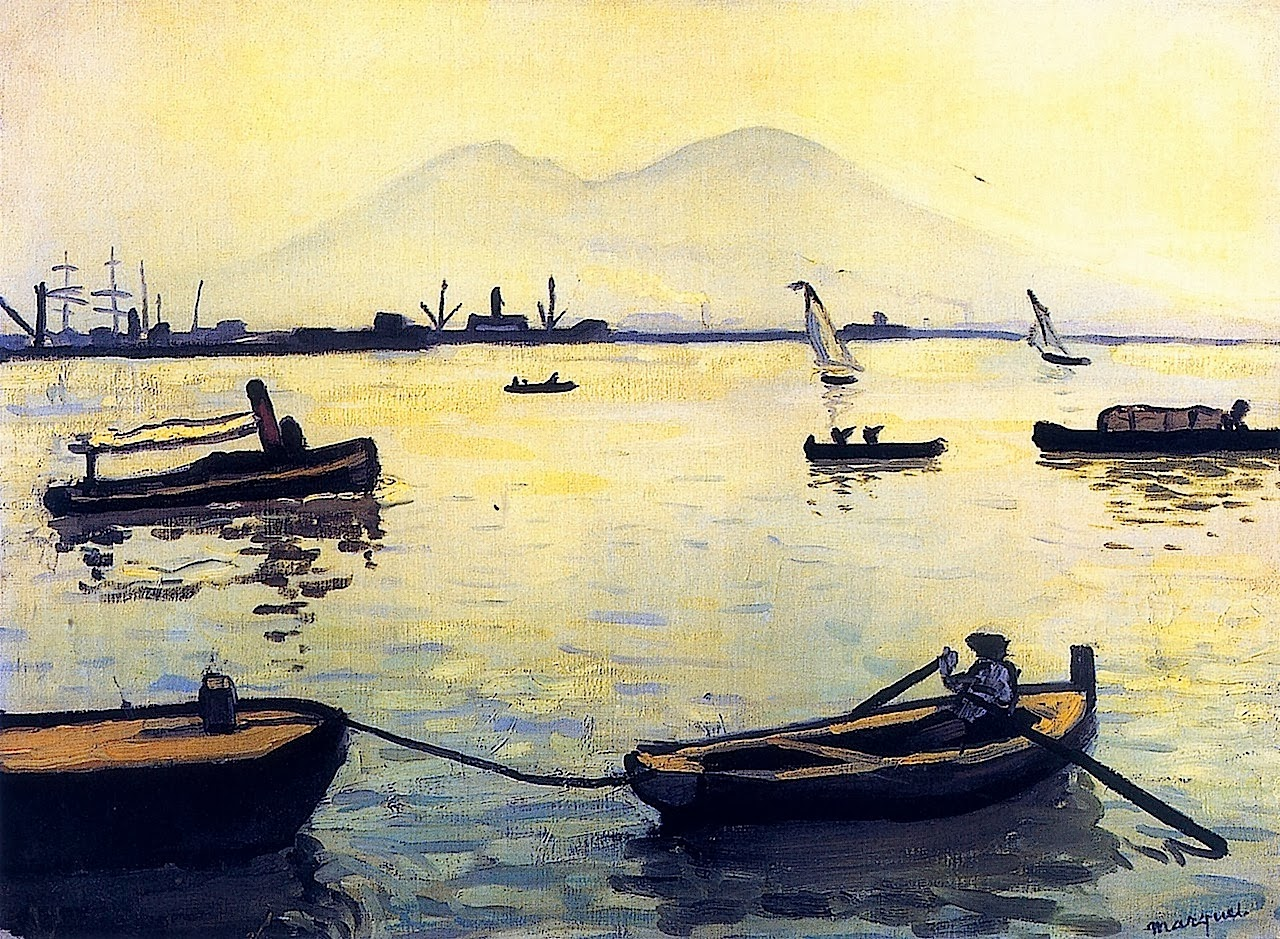
Vesuvius, c. 1909, Pushkin Museum

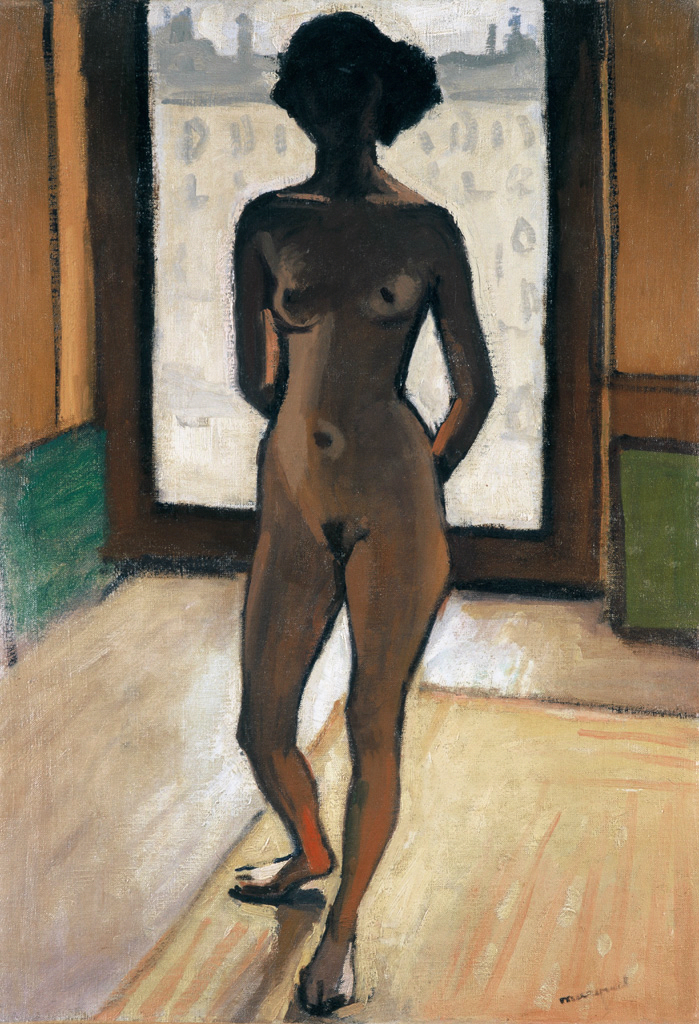
Nude against the light, 1909, Musée des Beaux-Arts de Bordeaux

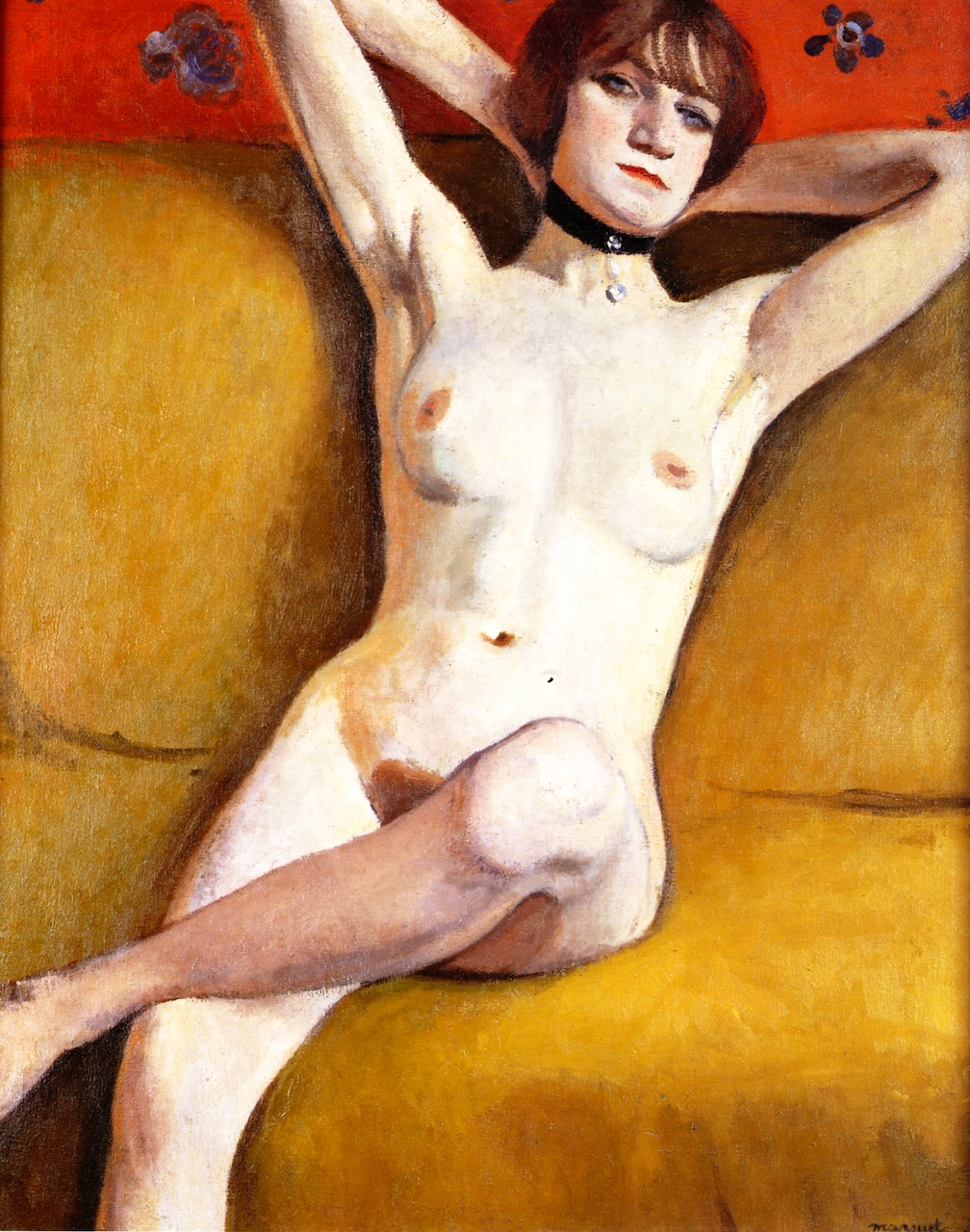
Nude on a Divan, 1912, Musée National d'Art Moderne

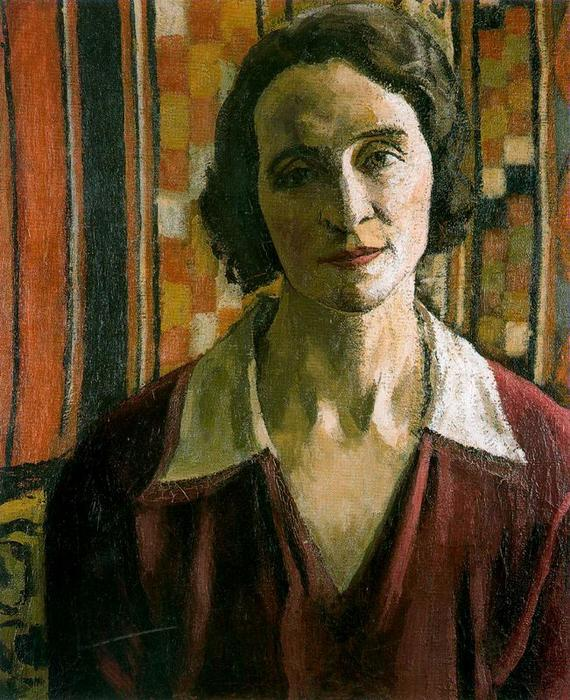
Portrait of Marcelle Marquet, 1931, Musée des Beaux-Arts de Bordeaux

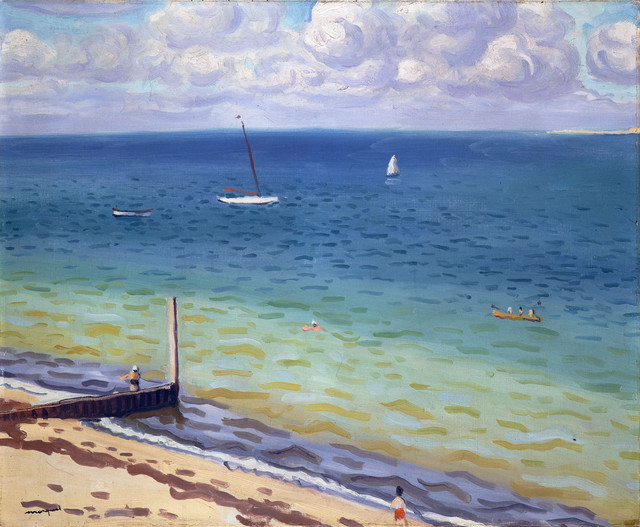
Le Pilat, 1935, Musée des Beaux-Arts de Bordeaux

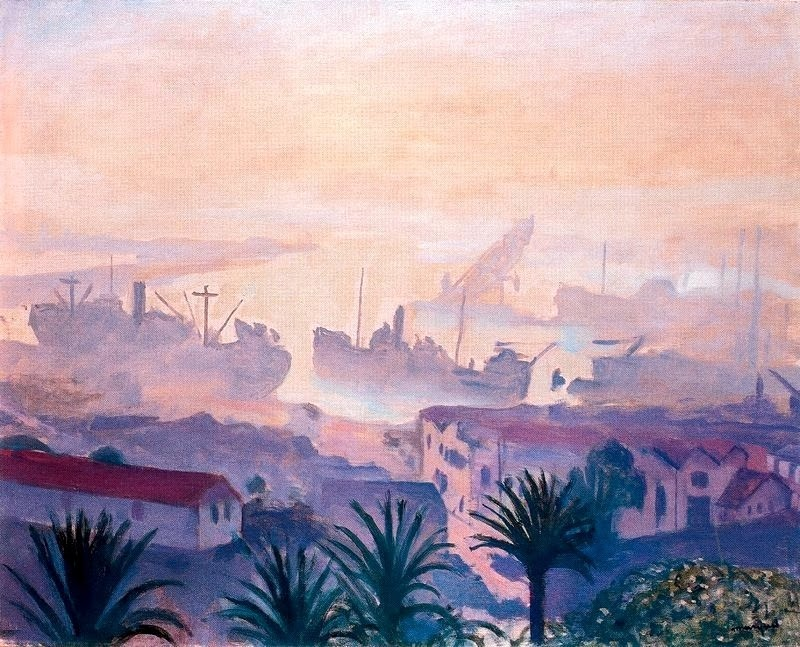
The port of Algiers with haze, 1943, Musée des Beaux-Arts de Bordeaux

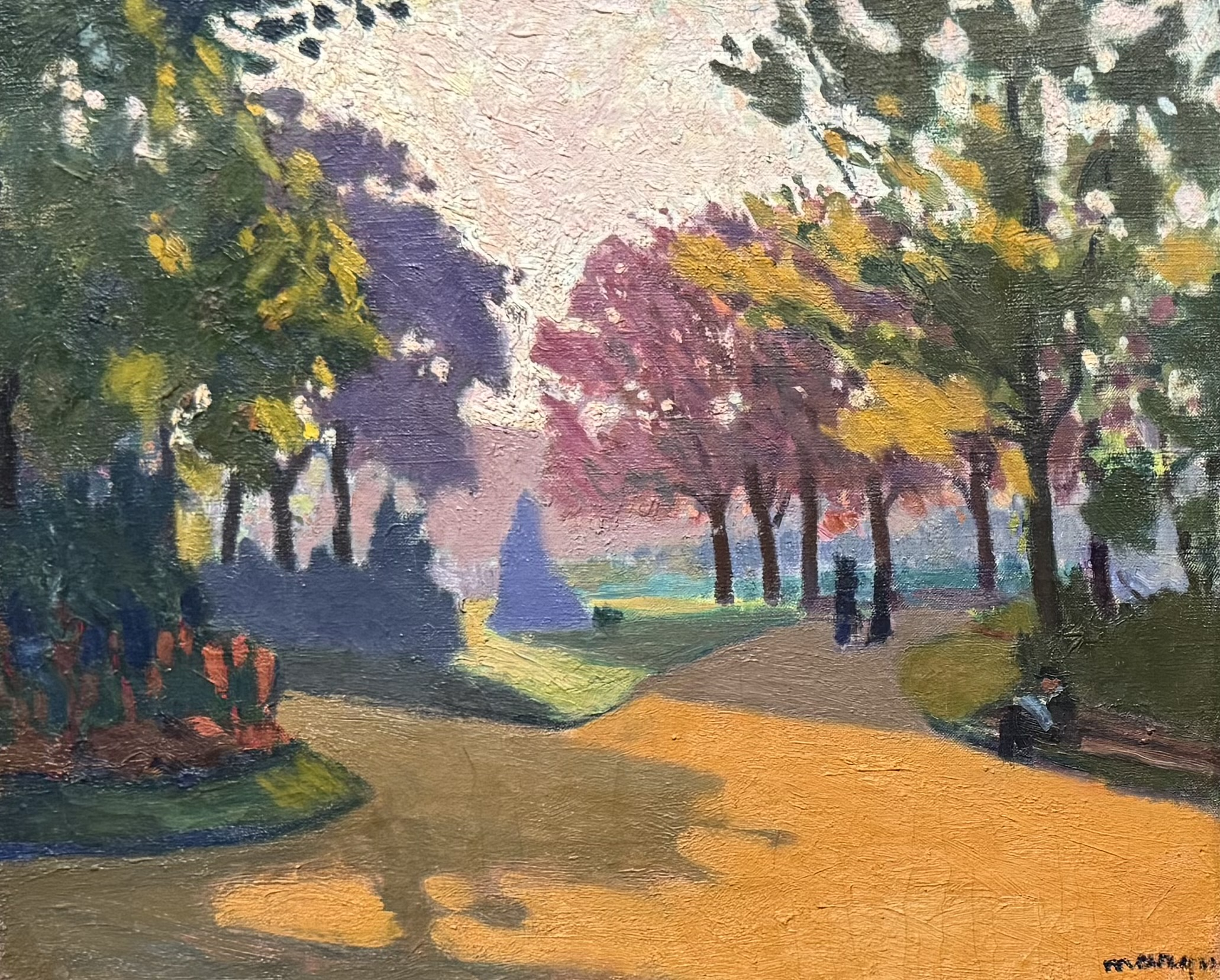
Luxembourg Gardens, (1898), Montreal Museum of Fine Arts
