= World University Service =

The World University Service (WUS) is an international organisation founded in 1920 in Vienna as an offshoot of the World Student Christian Federation to meet the needs of students and academics in the aftermath of World War I. After World War II, it merged with European Student Relief to become International Student Service and eventually WUS in the 1950s. In the 1970s it began to focus on campaigning for educational rights for the disadvantaged.

== See also ==
- David Atherton-Smith
