= Henriette Tirman =

French painter and printmaker

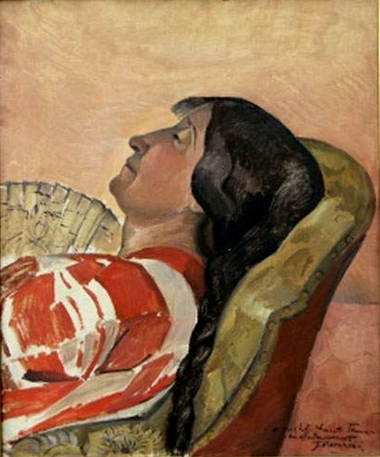
- Henriette Tirman, by Jean Marchand (1883-1940)
- Born: 9 July 1875
- Died: 30 October 1952 (aged 77)
- Known for: Painter
- Movement: Post-Impressionism
- Awards: Officier d'académie

Jeanne-Henriette Tirman (9 July 1875 – 30 October 1952) was a French Post-Impressionist painter, printmaker, and illustrator.

== Biography ==
Born in Charleville-Mézieres (Ardenne), she was the daughter of doctor Charles-Louis-Henry Tirman and Berte Hanonet de La Grange and also the niece of Senator Louis Tirman (1837–1899). She lived in the family of her brother, Councillor of State Alexandre-Louis-Albert Tirman (1868-1939) in Paris, 22 rue de l'Yvette.

Her art was influenced by Cézanne. She painted in a manner that respected Cézanne's ideas of logical composition, simple tonality, solidity of volume, and distinct separation of planes. While Matisse represented the reflective and rationalized aspects in the group, Tirman embodied a more spontaneous and instinctive style.

Tirman exhibited at the Salon de Champs-Élysées starting in 1897. In 1900 she had participated at the Exposition Universelle of Paris. Since 1906 to 1951 she exhibited her paintings at the Salon d'Automne and at the Salon Société Nationale des Beaux-Arts

Since 1907 exhibited at the Salon des Indépendants where her paintings were put together with those of Henri Matisse, René Schützenberger, Maurice de Vlaminck, Robert Delaunay, Othon Friesz, Wassily Kandinsky, Paul Signac, Georges Braque, Raoul Dufy, Henri Manguin, Georges Braque, Louis Valtat, Charles Camoin, Albert Marquet, Félix Vallotton and other artists.

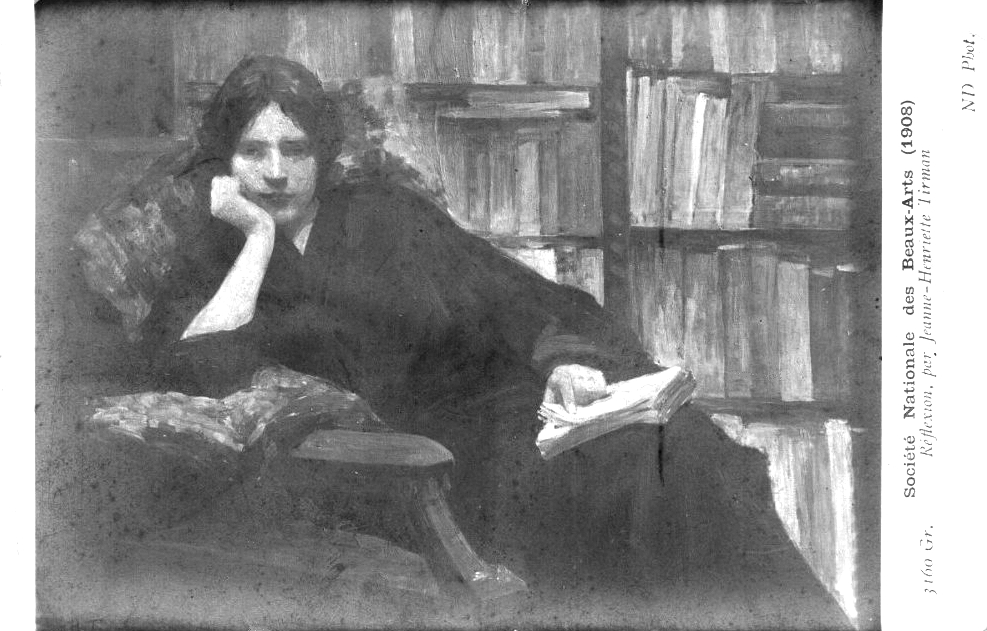
Jeanne-Henriette Tirman, Réflexion (self-portrait), Salon (SNBA) 1908

In 1915 she participated at the Exhibition of French and Belgian Art Panama–Pacific International Exposition. In 1919 she was working on illustrations for the periodical La Gerbe in woodcut technique together with Paul Signac, Henri Ottmann and other painters. In 1920, Tirman exhibited at the Gallery Marcel Bernheim together with Henri Manguin, Henri Ottmann and others.

Beginning in the 1920s, Tirman exhibited at the annual Salon des Tuileries in Paris.

In 1933 she took part in Salon de Echanges. At the same time, in company with her friend Sonia Lewitska (1880–1937), she helped André Fau and Francis Thieck in room decoration, suggesting services of painters from her closest circle: Raoul Dufy, André Lhote, André Hellé and Jean Marchand. Thereby she supported her friends in times of economic crisis in the country.

Like Othon Friesz she was part of group of artists called Artistes de ce Temps and exhibited at the Petit Palais in 1935.

In 1937, Tirman with friends created in her house (Paris, 22 rue de l'Yvette) the Society of Friends Sonia Lewitska, which organized in 1938 two retrospective exhibitions of the artist in the Gallery Sagot - Le Garrec.

After the death of her brother in 1939 she moved to Sèvres (Seine-et-Oise), to madam Berthe-Marie Cazin wife of ceramist Jean-Michel Cazin and lives in her house at 30 avenue de Bellevue.

She was rewarded with the rank of Officier d'Academie.

== Illustrations ==
- La Bhagavadgìta
- Bodhicaryavatara
- Shantideva, La Marche à la lumière
- Rudyard Kipling, Lettres du Japon (design of pages)
- Sainte-Beuve, Portraits de femmes
- Jean Cocteau, Bertrand Guégan (1892-1943); L'almanach de Cocagne pour l'an 1920-1922, Dédié aux vrais Gourmands Et aux Francs Buveurs (1921)
- La Gerbe (Nantes), periodical.

== Notes ==
- Bénézit, 1976 : Tirman ou Tirmon (Jeanne Henriette)
