= Sonia Lewitska =

Painter and printmaker (1880–1937)

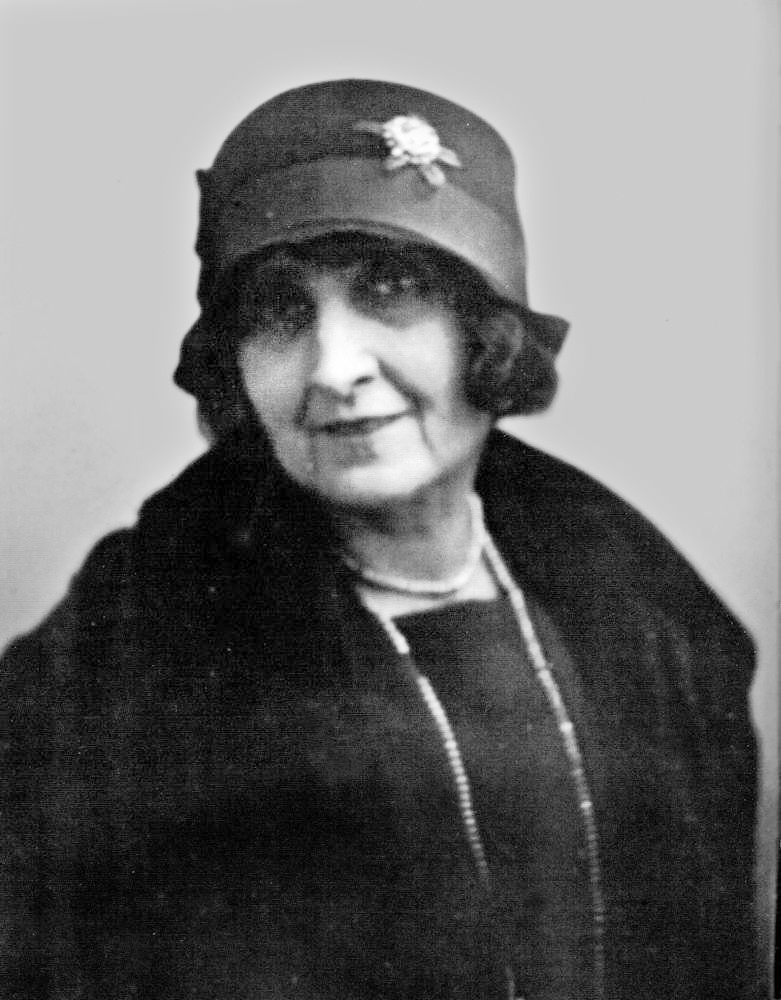
- Sonia Lewitzka
- Born: 9 March 1880; Vykhylivka Вихилівка (Russian Empire, later Ukraine)
- Died: 20 September 1937 (aged 57); Paris, France
- Known for: Painter
- Movement: Post-Impressionism

Sonia Lewitska (Polish: Zofia Lewicka, Ukrainian: Cофія Пилипівна Левицька; born 9 March 1880 in Vykhylivka, Russian Empire, now Ukraine; died 20 September 1937 in Paris) was a Ukrainian-born French painter and printmaker.

== Biography ==
Sonia Lewitska was a Post-Impressionist painter, printmaker and illustrator of Ukrainian origin, sister of Ukrainian writer and diplomat Modest Pylypovych Levytskyi (1866, Vilkhivtsi (Вільхівці Чемеровецького району), Podillia, Ukraine - Lutsk, Ukraine). Her father was an inspector of the public schools of the Podillya province. He was a friend of Volodymyr Antonovych and Tadej Rylskyj, he was actively interested in social and cultural work. Her childhood was in Kyiv and Vilkhivtsi. Her mother Modesta Byshovska (Biszowska) came from the Leszczyńskis (Leshchinskys). Her family was a highly educated and democratic, they spoke Ukrainian, well-fluent in German, French, Polish. Sonia graduated from Art School in Zhytomyr. In that town, at the age of 19, she got married Yustyn Manylovskyi, a local doctor, but he abused alcohol. After Art School she ran away from her husband, went to her parents in Vilkhivtsi, left her daughter Olga who was born with mental problems, and began to study Art with Serhiy Svetoslavsky in Kyiv. S.Svetoslavsky advised her to go to Paris and Sofia moved there in 1905 to study painting.

Sonia Lewitska engaged in a refined art without losing what a poet called the gift of childhood. Independent, she eschewed all art theory and only investigated the best means of translating her own interior vision into art. Often inspired by Slavic folklore. Lewitska was another early member of the Parisian group. In 1905 she settles in Paris and continued her studies with Jean Marchand, who later became her husband. Beginning as a cubist and fauvist, she moved into a Post-Impressionist style and became known for her illustrations of limited edition books.

She exhibited at the Salon d'Automne (1910–1913, 1919–1925, 1927–1934), the Salon des Indépendants (1910–1914, 1920–1922), the Section d'Or, the Salon des Tuileries (1929, 1932, 1933), the Paris galleries and at the International exhibitions.

In 1933 she took part in Salon de Echanges. At the same time, in accompany with her friend Henriette Tirman, she helps André Fau and Francis Thieck in room decoration suggesting services of painters from her closest circle: Raoul Dufy, André Lhote, André Hellé and Jean Marchand. Thereby she supported her friends in tough times of economic crisis in the country.

In 1937, Henriette Tirman with friends creates in her house the Society of Friends Sonia Lewitska, which organized in 1938 two retrospective exhibitions of the artist in the Gallery Sagot – Le Garrec.

== Illustrations ==
- Jean Cocteau, Bertrand Guégan (1892–1943); L'almanach de Cocagne pour l'an 1920–1922, Dédié aux vrais Gourmands Et aux Francs Buveurs (1921)

== Notes ==
- Bénézit, 1976 : Sonia Lewitska
