= Henri Ottmann =

French painter and printmaker (1877–1927)

Henry Ottmann
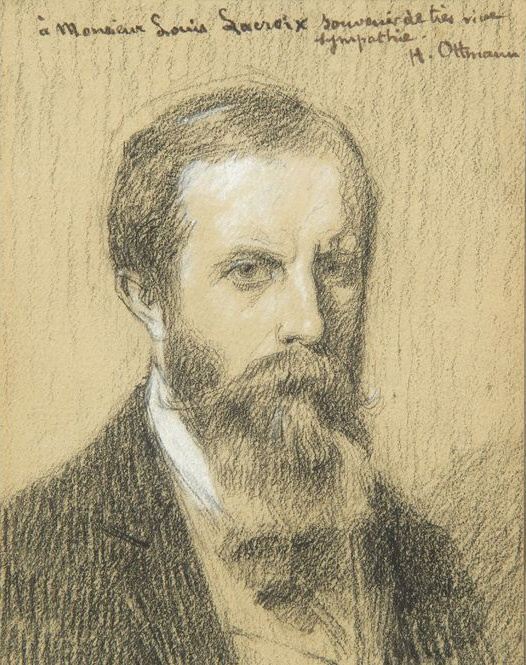
- Henry Ottmann, self-portrait c.1914
- Born: 10 April 1877; Ancenis (Loire-Atlantique), France
- Died: 1 June 1927; Vernon, France
- Known for: Painter
- Movement: Post-Impressionism

Henry Ottmann (also Henri Ottmann) (10 April 1877 – 1 June 1927) was a French painter and printmaker.

== Biography ==
Henry Ottmann was born on 10 April 1877 in Ancenis (Loire-Atlantique). He made his debut at the Salon La Libre Esthétique in Brussels in 1904 and took part in the Salon des Indépendants in Paris from 1905, the Salon d'Automne, the Salon Société Nationale des Beaux-Arts and the Salon des Tuileries.

In 1911 and 1912, Ottmann exhibited at the Artistes de la Société Moderne at the Gallery Paul Durand-Ruel together with Armand Guillaumin, Henri Lebasque and others. In 1912, he exhibited at the Galerie Eugène Druet. In 1919 he was working on illustrations of La Gebre periodical in woodcut technique together with Paul Signac, Henriette Tirman and other painters.

In 1920, Ottmann exhibited at the gallery Marcel Bernheim together with Manguin, Tirman, Alexandre-Paul Canu and others. In 1922, he exhibited at the Exposition du Cercle Artistique de Bruxelles together with those of Paul-Albert Besnard, Pierre Bonnard, Raoul Dufy, Othon Friesz, Charles Guérin, André Lhote, Henri Matisse, Paul Signac, Maurice de Vlaminck and others.

In 1926, Ottmann exhibited at the gallery L.Dru (Paris) and at the Parisian gallery La Palette Française, and in March 1927 in the gallery Armand Drouand.

He died in Vernon on 1 June 1927 after a car accident.

== Gallery of paintings ==
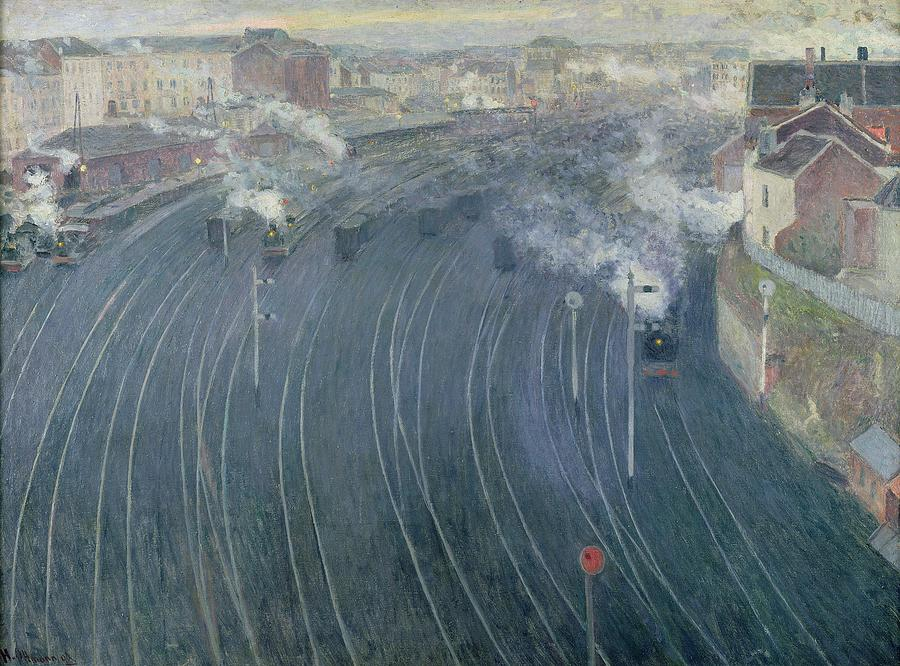
The Luxembourg Station in Brussels, 1903; (Musée d'Orsay)

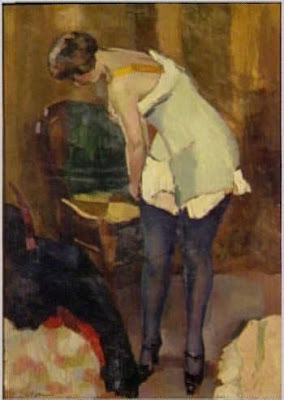
Woman With Blue Stockings, 1917; (Musée National d'Art Moderne)

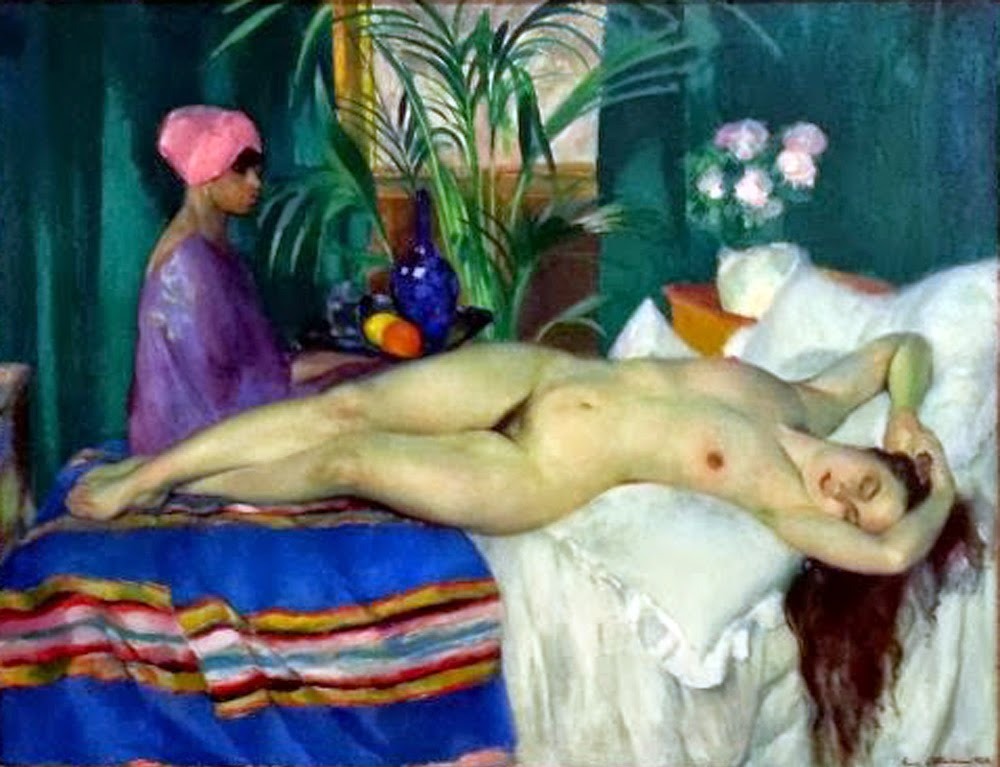
Sleeping Courtesan, 1920; (Musée National d'Art Moderne)

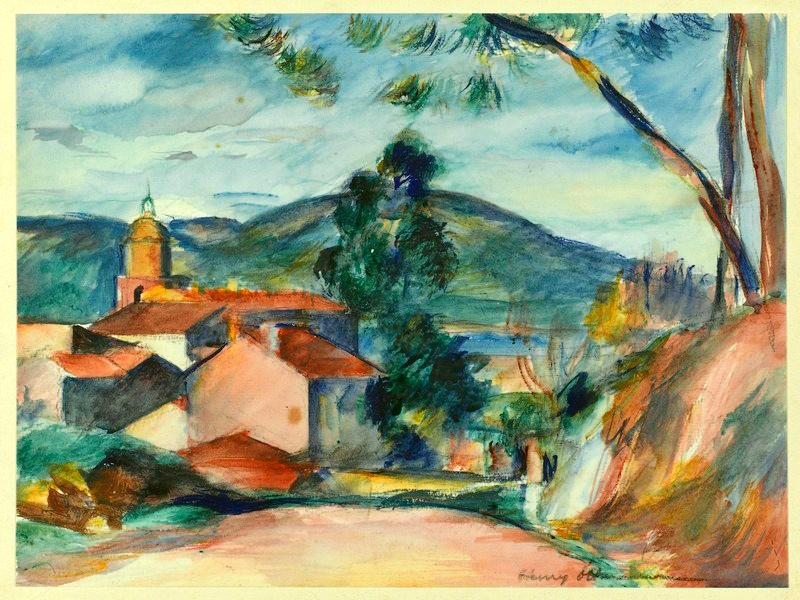
Saint-Tropez, 1927 (Musée National d'Art Moderne)

Sources

- Site Oxford Index Benezit Dictionary of Artists, 2006, (subscription or library membership required)
- Gazette des beaux-arts 1906/07 (A48,T36)-1906/12, p.476, Salon d'automne, Gallica BnF
- Les Hommes du Jour, 1914/05/30 (A7,N332) p.10, Gallica BnF
- Le Carnet des artistes: art ancien, art moderne, arts appliqués/ rédacteur en chef Louis Vauxcelles, 1917 (N1)- (N21), p.3, Henry Ottmann, Gallica BnF
- Le Bulletin de la vie artistique, 1923/07/01 (A4,N13), p.281; 1926/05/15 (A7,N10) p. 152;1926/06/01 (A7,N11) Gallica BnF
- Gazette des beaux-arts; 1920/07 (A62,T2)-1920/12, p.320; 1925/07 (A67,T12)-1925/12, p.277; 1926/01 (A68,T13)-1926/06, p.279; 1927/07 (A69,T16)-1927/12, p.323; Gallica BnF
- La Revue de l'art ancien et moderne, 1926/01 (T49)-1926/05, p.156; 1927/06 (T52)-1927/12, p.221 Gallica BnF
- Art et décoration; 1920/01 (T37)-1920/06; p.75; 1927/07 (A31,T52,N307)-1927/12 (A31,T52,N312), p.162. Gallica BnF
- Les Annales politiques et littéraires: revue populaire paraissant le dimanche/ dir. Adolphe Brisson, 1927/06/15 (T88,N2288), p.621, Retrospective, 1928/07/15 (N2314), p.82 Gallica BnF
- La Renaissance de l'art français et des industries de luxe, p.361;1926/06 (A9,N6); 1926/07 (A9,N7), p.432;1926/07 (A9,N7), p 624; Retrospective, 1928/01 (A11,N1)-1928/12 (A11,N12), p.358; Retrospective, 1930/08 p.214 Gallica BnF
- Journal des débats politiques et littéraires, 1928/06/29 (Numéro 180), p.4 Tableaux Modernes Gallica BnF
- Les Trois Grâces Henry Ottmann, retrospective 1933 at the gallery Georges Petit (Hôtel Drouot) archive.org
