= Henri Manguin =

French painter

Henri-Charles Manguin
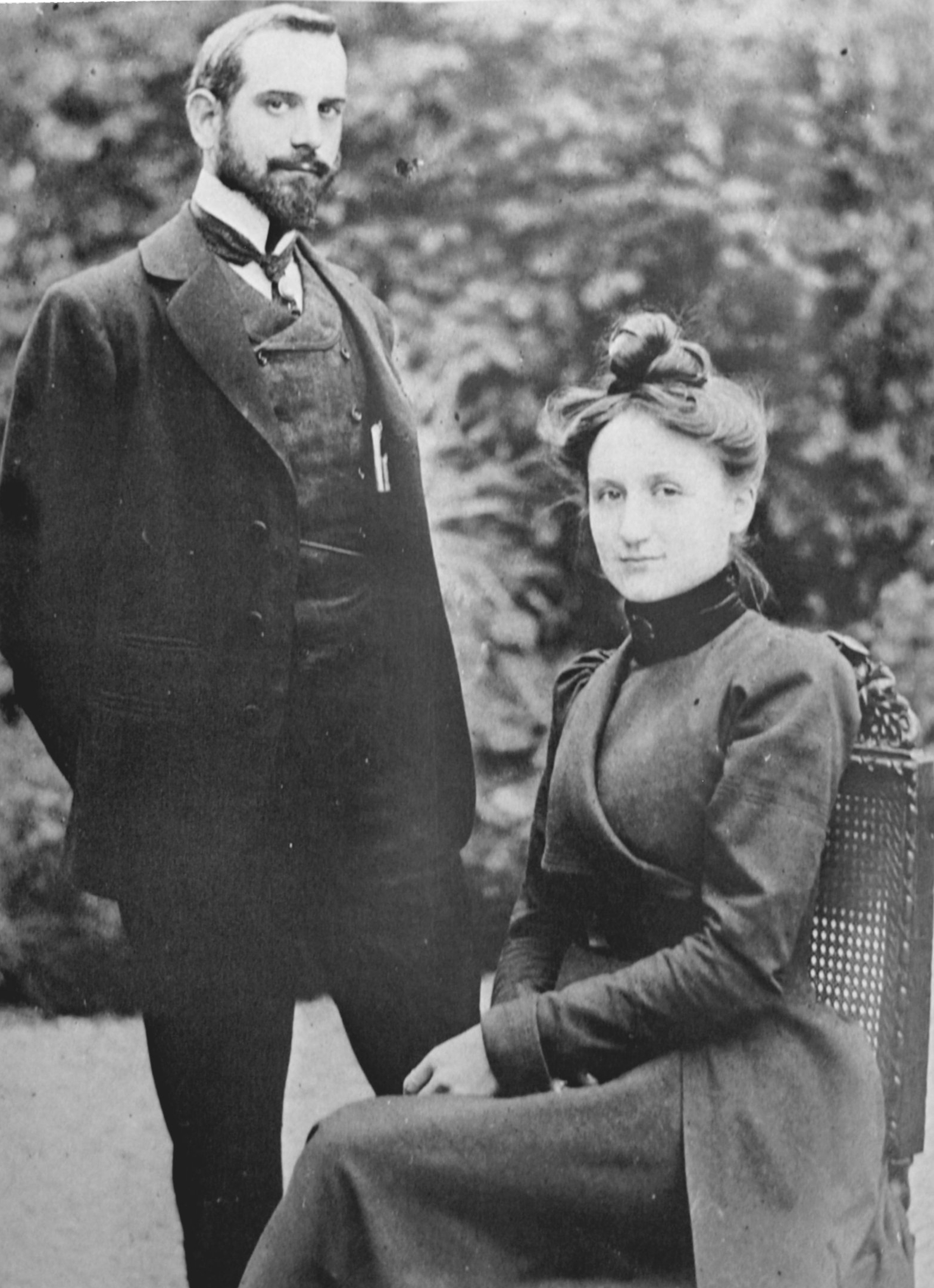
- Henri and Jeanne Manguin, 1900
- Born: 23 March 1874; Paris, France
- Died: 25 September 1949 (aged 75); Saint-Tropez, France
- Known for: Painter
- Movement: Post-Impressionism, Fauvism

Henri Charles Manguin (French pronunciation: [ɑ̃ʁi ʃaʁl mɑ̃gɛ̃]; 23 March 1874 – 25 September 1949) was a French painter, associated with the Fauves.

Manguin entered the École des Beaux-Arts to study under Gustave Moreau, as did Henri Matisse and Charles Camoin with whom he became close friends. Like them, Manguin made copies of Renaissance art in the Louvre.

Manguin was greatly influenced by Impressionism, as is seen in his use of bright pastel hues.

He married in 1899 and made numerous portraits of his wife, Jeanne, and their family. In 1902, Manguin had his first exhibition at the Salon des Indépendants and Salon d'Automne. Many of his paintings were of Mediterranean landscapes; and would soon represent the height of his career as a Fauve artist.

== 1905 Indépendants ==
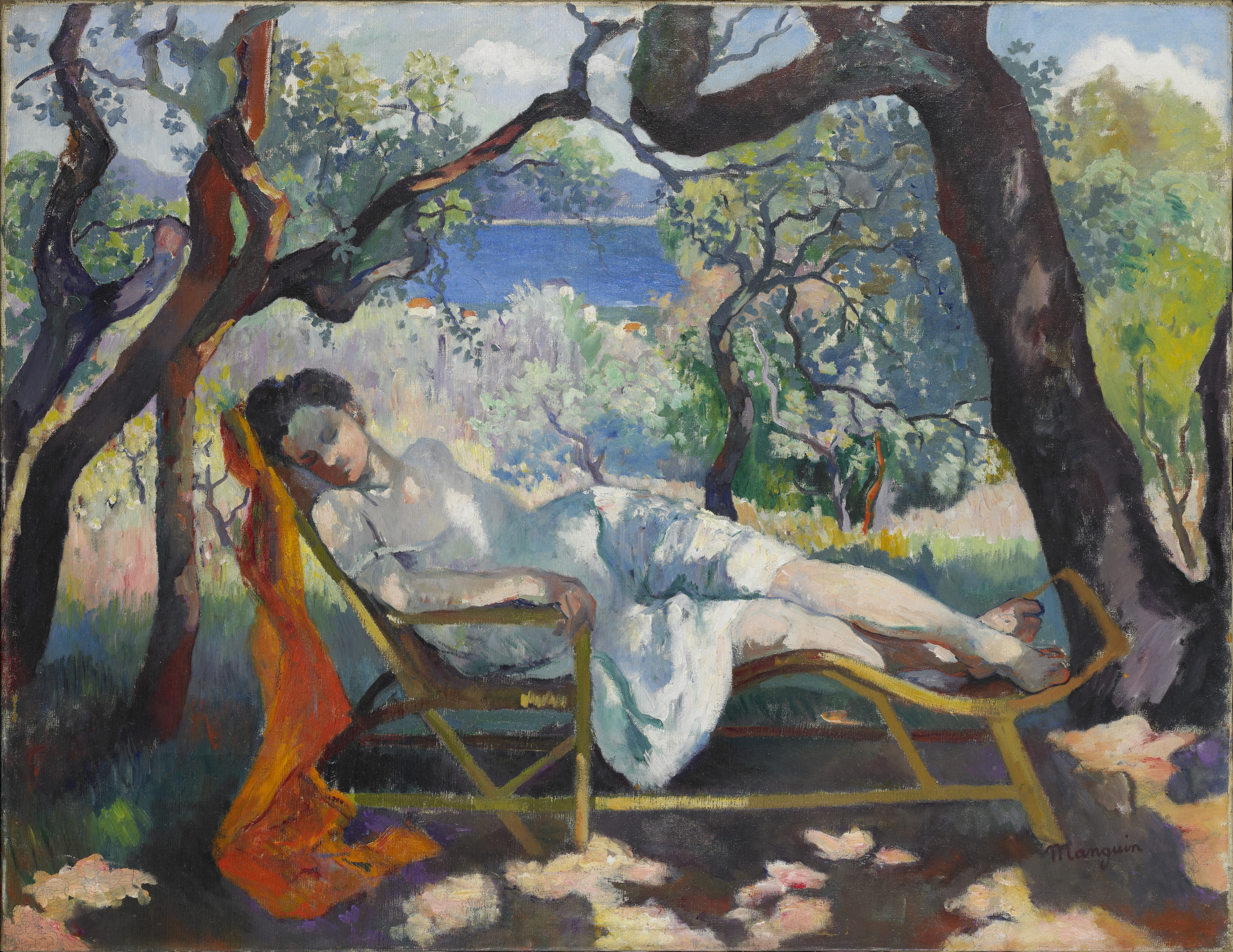
Henri Manguin, 1905, La Sieste (Le repos, Jeanne, Le rocking-chair), oil on canvas, 88.9 x 116.84 cm, Villa Flora, Winterthur, Switzerland

From 24 March to 30 April, the burgeoning of Fauvism was visible at the Indépendants, prior to the infamous Salon d'Automne exhibition of 1905 which historically marks the birth of the term Fauvism, after critic Louis Vauxcelles described their show of work with the phrase "Donatello chez les fauves" ("Donatello among the wild beasts"), contrasting the paintings with a Renaissance-style sculpture that shared the room with them.

At the 1905 Indépendants Manguin exhibited with Henri Matisse, Albert Marquet, Jean Puy, Othon Friesz, Raoul Dufy, Kees van Dongen, André Derain, Maurice de Vlaminck, Charles Camoin and Jean Metzinger. This exhibition was reviewed by Vauxcelles in Gil Blas on 4, 18 and 23 March 1905.

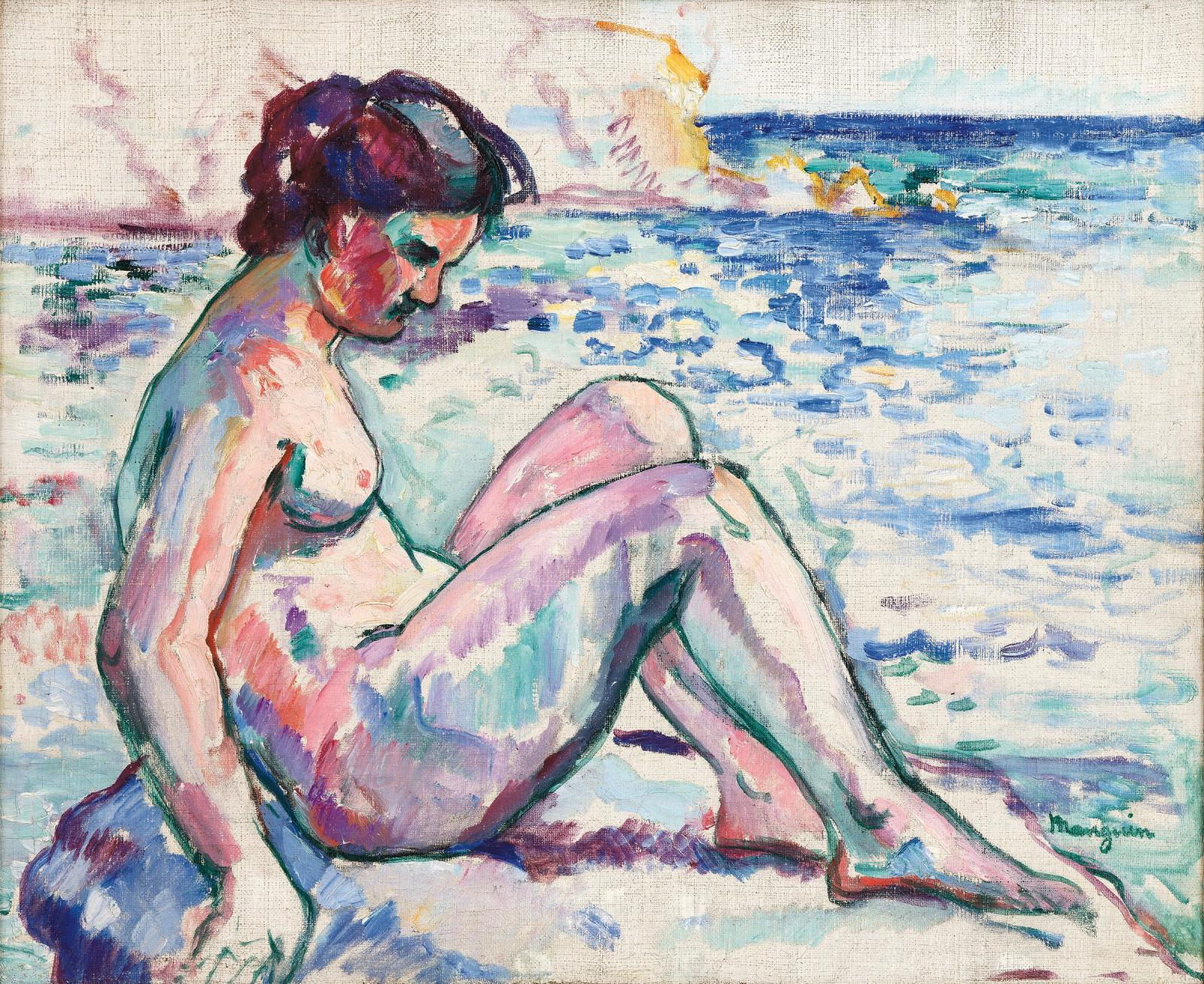
Jeanne au rocher (Cavalière), 1906, oil on canvas, 50 x 61 cm

Matisse was in charge of the hanging committee, assisted by Manguin, Metzinger, Bonnard, Camoin, Laprade Luce, Marquet, Puy and Vallotton.

== From 1920 ==
In 1920, Manguin exhibited at the Gallery Marcel Bernheim together with Ottmann, Tirman, Alexandre-Paul Canu and others. He traveled extensively with Albert Marquet throughout Southern Europe. In 1949, Manguin left Paris to settle in Saint-Tropez, where he died soon after, on 25 September 1949.

== Gallery of paintings ==
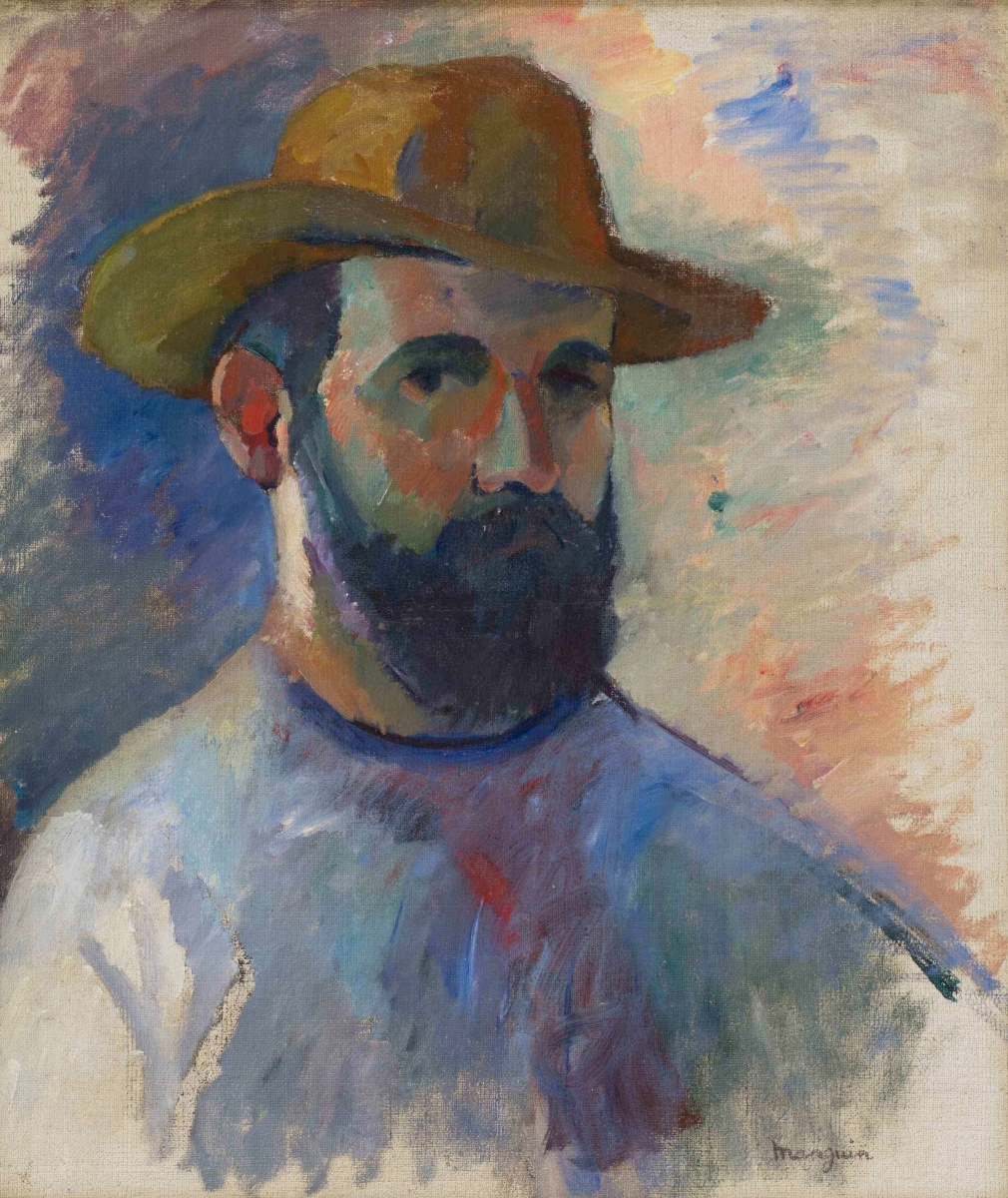
Self-portrait (Autoportrait), 1905, oil on canvas, 55 x 46 cm, private collection

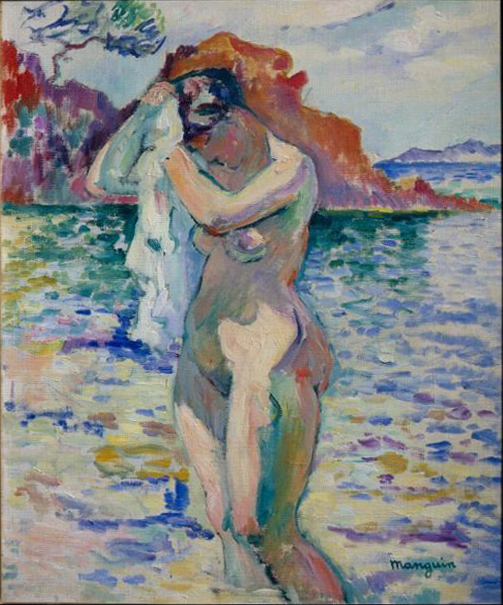
Baigneuse (Woman Bather), 1906, oil on canvas, Pushkin Museum

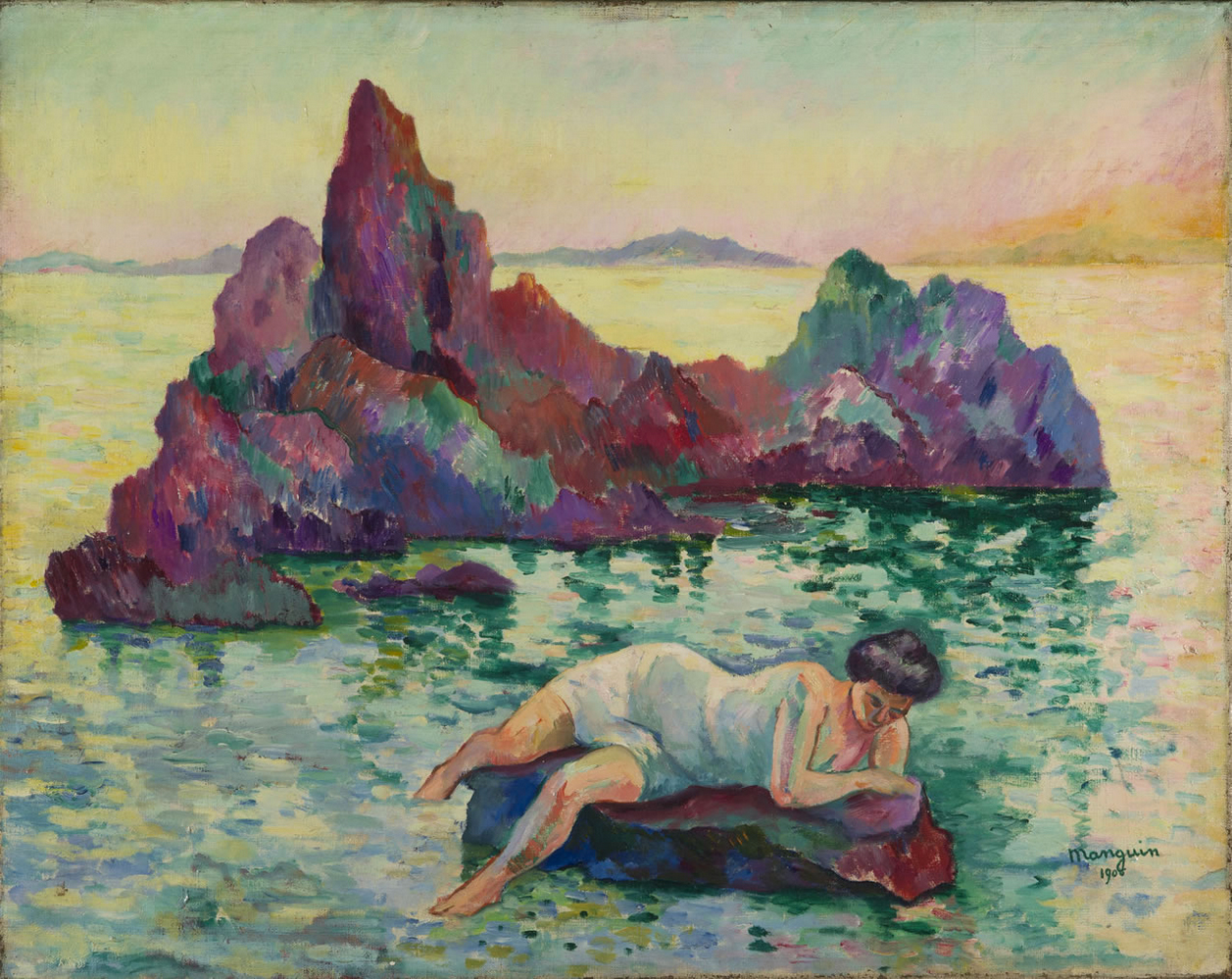
Le Rocher (La Naïade, Cavalière), 1906, oil on canvas, 71 × 89 cm, private collection

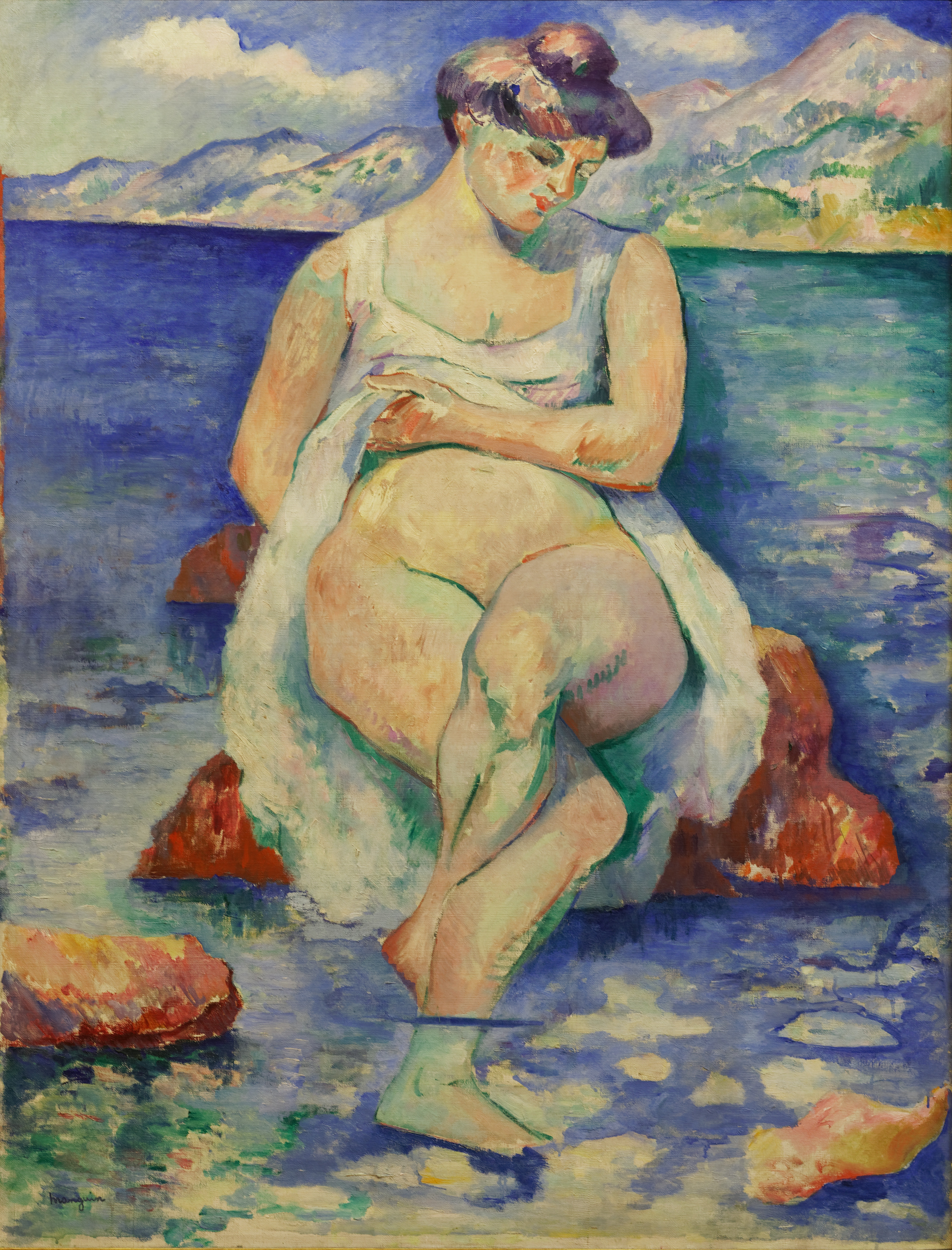
La Baigneuse, 1906, oil on canvas, 116.5 x 89.5 cm, Museum of Grenoble

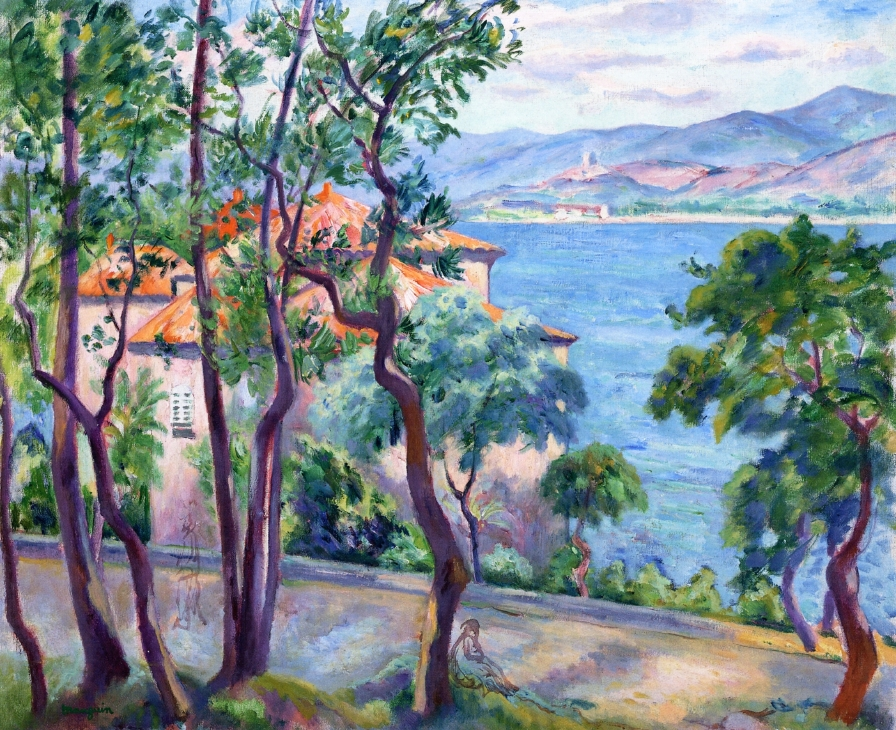
Above the Oustalet (View over Grimand), 1920, oil on canvas, 65 x 81 cm, private collection
