= The White Bull =

Literary work by Voltaire

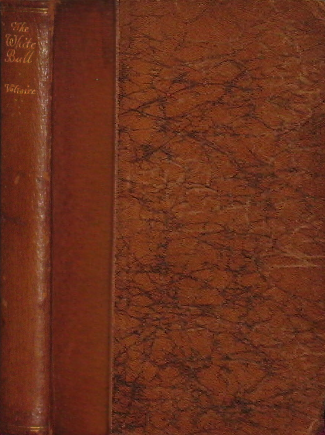
- Author: Voltaire
- Original title: Le Taureau Blanc
- Language: French
- Genre: Conte philosophique; satire; picaresque novel; bildungsroman
- Publisher: first printed for J. Murray, the next year printed in Geneva
- Publication date: 1773–4
- Publication place: France
- Media type: Print

The White Bull (original title in French: Le Taureau Blanc) is a fable and a work of "contes philosophiques", a philosophical novel, written by the Age of Enlightenment-era philosopher Voltaire. The story is based on the Greek tale of Europa and the bull, where the white bull is in fact the Greek god Zeus.

The date the story was written is unknown but it was published between the years 1773 and 1774. Voltaire's work seems to be prophetic in nature because the story was published only fifteen years before the French Revolution, when beheadings became common. An English translation of the work, with a 144-page preface to the text, was produced by the philosopher and reformer Jeremy Bentham and published in London in 1774.

== Summary ==
=== Chapter 1 ===
How the Princess Amasidia met a bull

The story takes place in Ancient Egypt where Princess Amasidia, daughter to King Amasis, is walking along the Pelusium Way in the company of Old Mambres, who the king appointed to be in charge of her household. She is deeply saddened as her love has been missing for 7 years and the King has forbidden him. No one in the kingdom is to even speak his name. While walking along the Pelusium Way she encounters many majestic creatures one which is the most beautiful White Bull she has ever seen. As soon as the Bull sees the princess he tries to run towards her as a peculiar old lady tries to restrain the bull. As soon as the Bull reaches princess Amasidia, he throws himself to the ground weeping and kissing her feet. As soon as the princess sees this she offers to purchase the Bull and the bull seems to want to be with the princess, yet the bull cannot speak. Seeing that Amasidia wants the bull, Mambres goes to the old women to try to persuade her to sell the bull.

=== Chapter 2 ===
How wise Mambres, former sorcerer to the Pharaohs, recognized an old woman, and how she recognized him

As Mambres tries to persuade the old lady to sell the bull, she states that the bull is not hers to sell, like the rest of the animals they see there. Then they speak of how they met 700 years ago when Mambres was traveling from Syria to Egypt. The old lady was the noble Pythoness of Endor. The old woman states that even though they are old friends, she cannot satisfy their curiosity about the bull. Amasidia then goes to talk to the woman about buying the bull, yet the old lady still refuses. The lady says you are welcome to see the bull and feed him to your likings but he is never to leave the watch of the other animals and the old lady. They argue and Amasidia asks if he were to escape she would not be able to restrain him, but the old lady says that if he were to do that, the magical serpent might give the bull a venomous bite. As the day turns to night Amasidia knows that she has to return home and leave the bull.

=== Chapter 3 ===
How the fair Amasidia held secret converse with a handsome serpent

The next day Amasidia and Mambres are talking and decide the bull truly is a majestic creature and they start devising a plan to speak with the serpent. Mambres sets up a meeting between the princess and the serpent, and informs her that to get a secret from the serpent she must flatter him. They speak of his past presence as a god, and the serpent informs the princess that she has a certain power over him, the same power which he is to have over others. The serpent then agrees to tell Amasidia the tale of the white bull. The bull used to be a king who fell in love with his dreams as he slept. Wanting to remember them he hired Magi to retell him his dreams and interpret them for him. The Magi failed and the king had them hanged. Then about seven years ago a Jew interpreted his dream, and then suddenly the king turned into the ox he is now. Upon hearing that the ox is her lost love she faints, and Mambres rushes over, thinking she is dead.

=== Chapter 4 ===
How they wanted to sacrifice the ox and exorcize the Princess

The bull saw the princess' ladies rushing to her and did the same whilst dragging the old lady. No one could wake the princess till the bull arrived. Then the princess abruptly awoke. She then showered the bull with kisses and all of the princess's ladies were bewildered. The ladies rushed back to their homes and told different stories to all who would hear. With all the talk of this gossip the king took wind of the story. Upon hearing the story he was filled with anger and sentenced his daughter to be locked in her chamber. Mambres knowing that the bull was the princess's love had to keep it a secret because that man was Nabuchad the one who had dethroned Amasis 7 years prior. The king had hired the Jew to perform the metamorphosis. Mambres then informs the princess that the only metamorphosis that can be changed back is one of an ox.

=== Chapter 5 ===
How wise Mambres acted wisely

Mambres then tries to trick the old lady into giving the ox to him so that he may hide him in one of his country's stables. Mambres then devised a plan to appoint the white bull as the new bull god Apis, and sent four magical animals, a raven, she-ass, dog, and dove to deliver a letter to the High Priest of Memphis, so that the priests could come and worship the new bull. He used tests to see if the animals were trustworthy, and all passed but the raven, who left displeased. Mambres then sent three servants to follow the animals.

=== Chapter 6 ===
How Mambres met three prophets and gave them a good dinner

Upon talking to his servants, they revealed themselves as the three prophets, Daniel, Ezekiel, and Jeremiah. He then invited them along with the old lady and bull to a great dinner. The white bull was unable to take part in the feast as he was an animal and his identity was unknown to them. He sat angered as the prophet that had imprisoned him, Daniel, and the old lady got to enjoy a feast while he lay in the grass hungry. The dinner continued and the prophets, Mambres, and the old lady feasted and drank wine, telling stories. Then the prophets and Mambres walked along the Nile talking into the night. The white bull seeing an opportunity to strike his enemies took it and as he was charging towards the prophets the master of things transformed them into magpies so they were not harmed.

=== Chapter 7 ===
The King of Tanis arrives. His daughter and the bull are to be sacrificed.

As the King arrived he yelled out saying that the bull needed to be tied up and thrown out into the Nile where the whale of Jonas was to eat him, for having placed a spell on his daughter. Mambres, knowing that the raven had told the king everything, had the serpent go to Amasidia and reassure her that everything would be okay. Mambres then told the king that the bull needed to stay alive until another suitor had been found for the bull god Apis. The king agreed and gave Mambres one week to find a replacement. The old lady had departed spirits to try and scare the king into not sacrificing the bull, but just like Nabuchad he did not remember in the morning.

=== Chapter 8 ===
How the serpent told stories to the Princess, to comfort her

The serpent told stories to Amasidia to calm her, telling her times when he cured serpent bites by just displaying himself on the end of a stick. He told her other inspirational stories and in order that her night might not be filled with grief.

=== Chapter 9 ===
How the serpent brought her no comfort

The princess remarked to the serpent stories by saying they did nothing but bore her. She needed stories that did not resemble dreams. He continued to tell her plausible stories, but she was not entertained. After one tale of love she could not refrain and yelled the name of her lover, Nebuchadnezzar! Her ladies also yelled the name, and the raven went to inform the king, as it was still an offense to even utter his name. Amasis was enraged again and sent 12 of his evilest men to gather his daughter.

=== Chapter 10 ===
How they wanted to cut off the Princess's head, and how they did not cut it off

As they brought the Princess to Amasis, he re-informed her how by uttering his name one is condemned to death. She told her father to carry out the penalty, but to first allow her to bewail her virginity. He granted her wish and said tomorrow both you and the bull will be killed. Priests arriving due to the letter, and crowds joined from all reaches of the kingdom, all chanting "Our ox is dead and done, we'll find ourselves a better one."

=== Chapter 11 ===
How the princess married her ox

The king was surprised by this spectacle, and did not carry out the killing of the bull. The priests had arrived just in time to worship Nebuchad as the new Apis. Mambres then told the king that he should be the first to untie the ox and worship him, and the king obliged. Then Amasis went to kill his daughter as if he didn't he would be sentenced to hell. While preparing for the killing, Amasidia shouted her love for Nebuchad. Upon becoming the new bull god Nebuchad gained the ability to speak and shouted back to Amasidia that he will love her till his death. After this the bull regained his human form in front of the large crowd. Then Nebuchad said, "I would rather be Amasidia's lover than a god. I am Nebuchadnezzar, King of Kings." Nebuchad then married Amasidia on the spot and showed mercy to his new father-in-law and let him keep his kingdom of Tanis. He also bestowed foundations to the dove, she-ass, dog, whale, three magpies, and even the raven, showing the whole world that he could pardon as well as conquer. The old lady even received a fat pension. This created a custom that was passed on to all kings, that all can be pardoned after recognizing the error of their ways.

== Cultural background ==
The story is based on the Greek mythological tale of Europa and the bull, where the white bull is the king of the Greek gods, Zeus, in disguise. Zeus, the sky and thunder god of the Olympic pantheon, often wore a disguise when romantically pursuing mortal women, so as to avoid the eye of his wife and sister, Hera.

The stories of the Greek Olympic pantheon would have been well known by the educated people of Voltaire's time.

In 1951 an illustrated version was published by the French erotic painter Paul-Émile Bécat.
