= Jean Marchand (painter) =

French painter (1883–1940)

Jean-Hippolyte Marchand
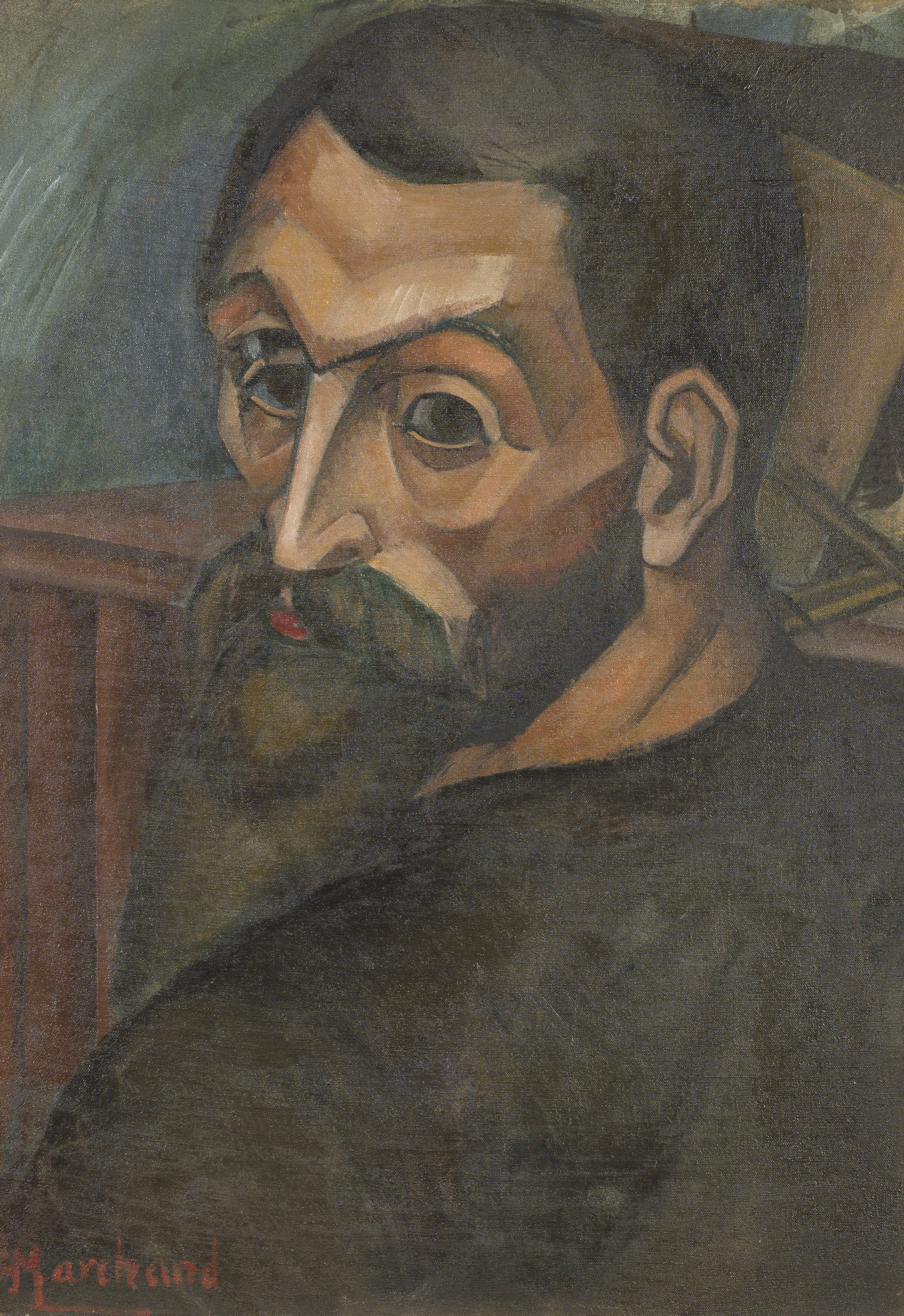
- Self-portrait
- Born: 21 November 1883; Paris, France
- Died: 1940 (aged 56–57); Paris, France
- Known for: Painter
- Movement: Post-Impressionism, Cubism

Jean Hippolyte Marchand (French pronunciation: [ʒɑ̃ ipɔlit maʁʃɑ̃]; 21 November 1883 – 1940) was a French cubist painter, printmaker and illustrator with an association with figures of the Bloomsbury Group.

== Biography ==
Marchand was born in Paris and studied at the École des Beaux-Arts under Léon Bonnat from 1902 through 1906. In 1910 his painting Still Life with Bananas was exhibited in the 1910 Manet and Post-Impressionism show organized by Roger Fry and then in a second show in 1912 organized by Fry with Clive Bell, both at the Grafton Galleries in London. This led to a kind of adoption of Marchand by the Bloomsbury circle, and his work was bought by the important British collector Samuel Courtauld.

The painter exhibited at the Salon d'Automne, the Salon des Indépendants and the Section d'Or. Marchand also produced woodcut illustrations for Paul Claudel's book, Le Chemin de la Croix, and for Paul Valery's Le Serpent in 1927.

He was married to painter and printmaker Sonia Lewitska (1880-1937).

== Paintings ==
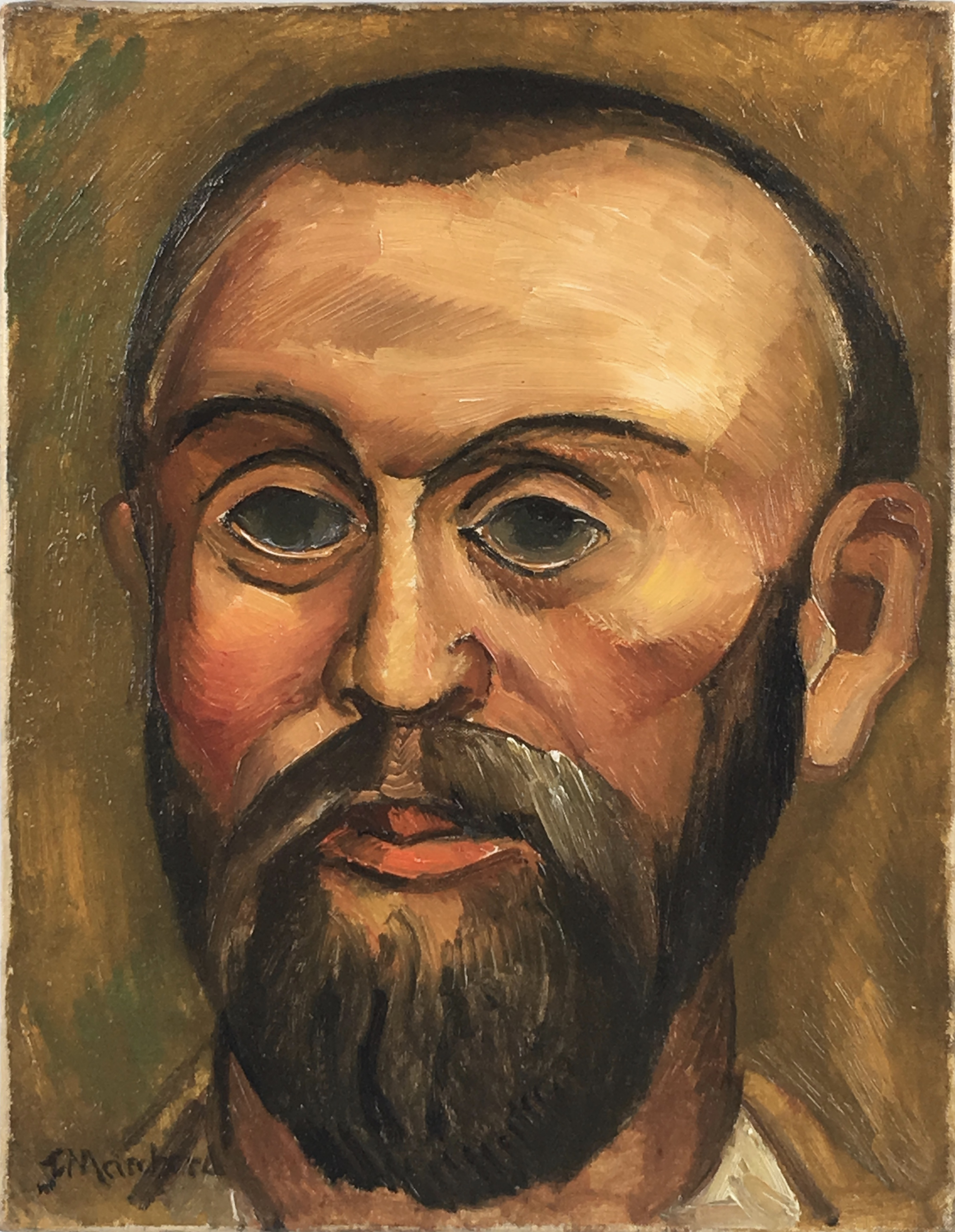
Self-portrait

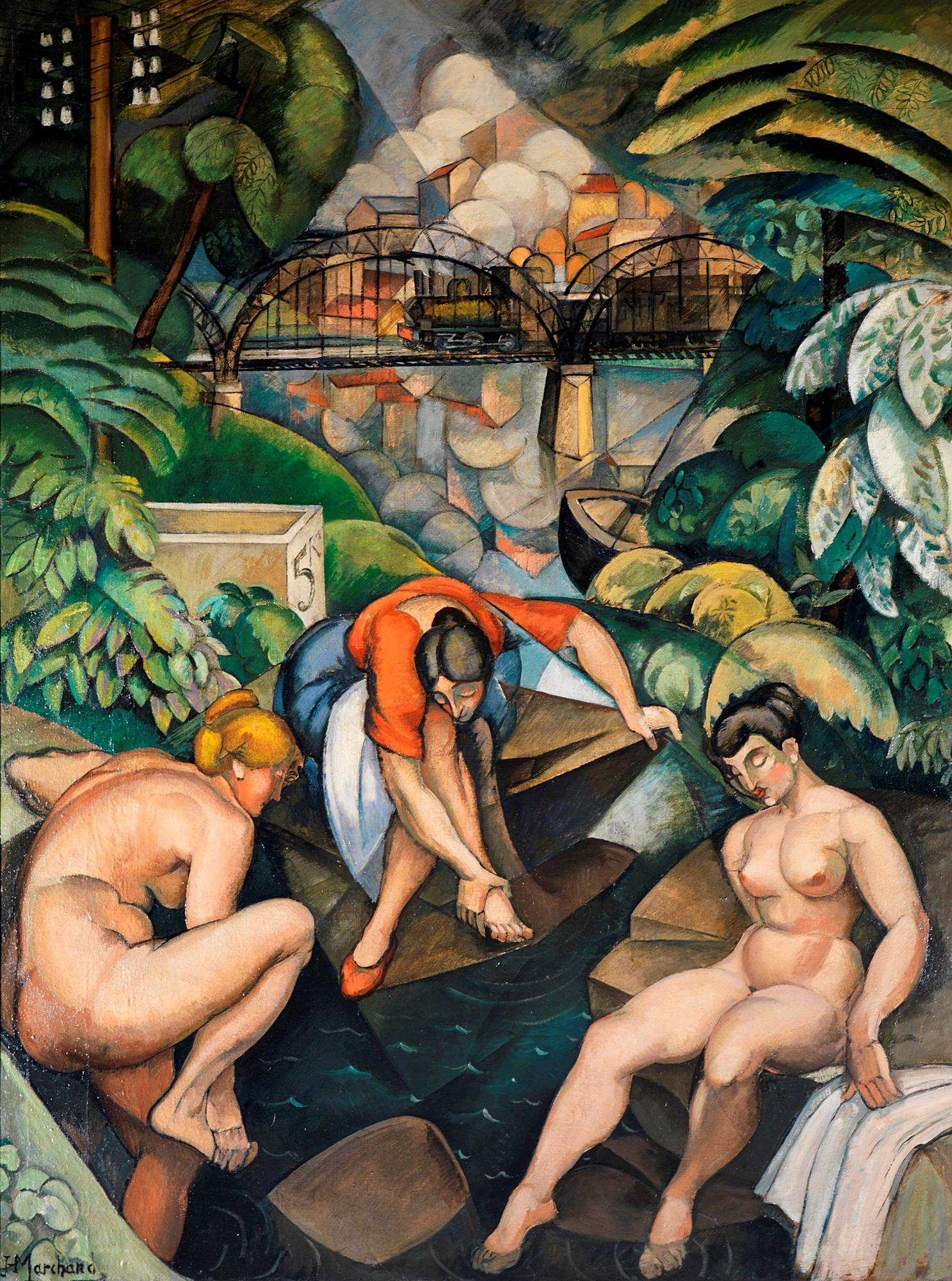
La Source c.1911

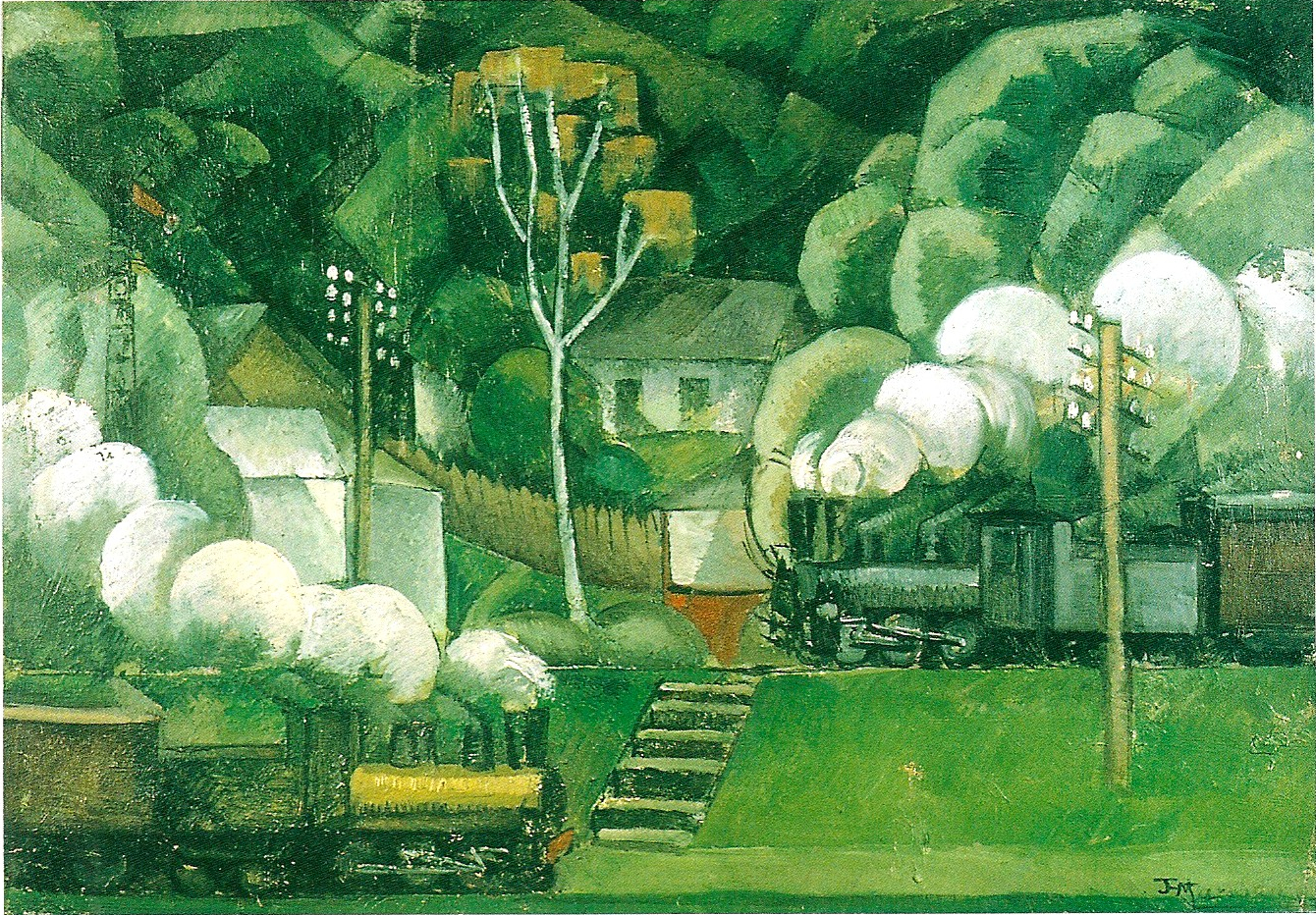
Chemins de fer en Russie 1911

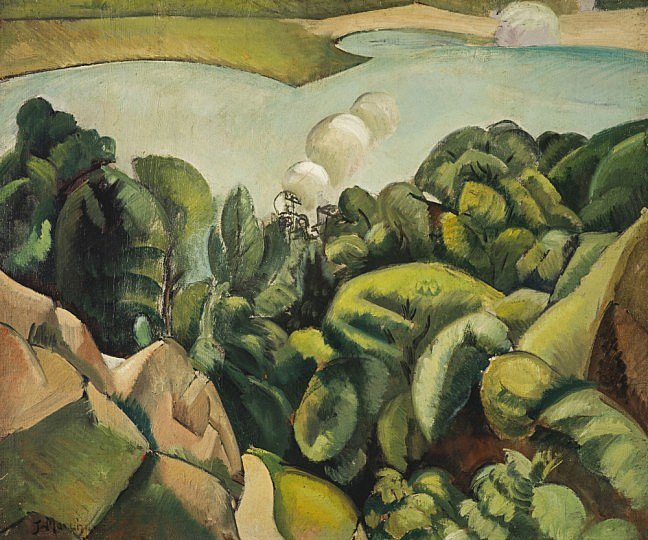
The Lake 1910

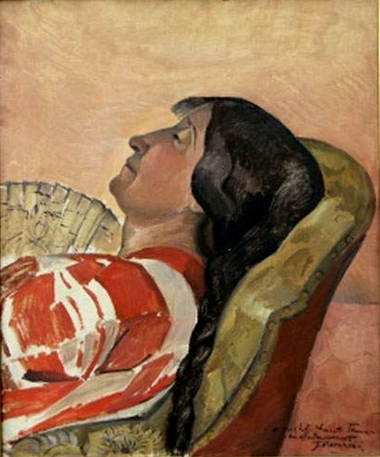
La sieste d'Henriette Tirman

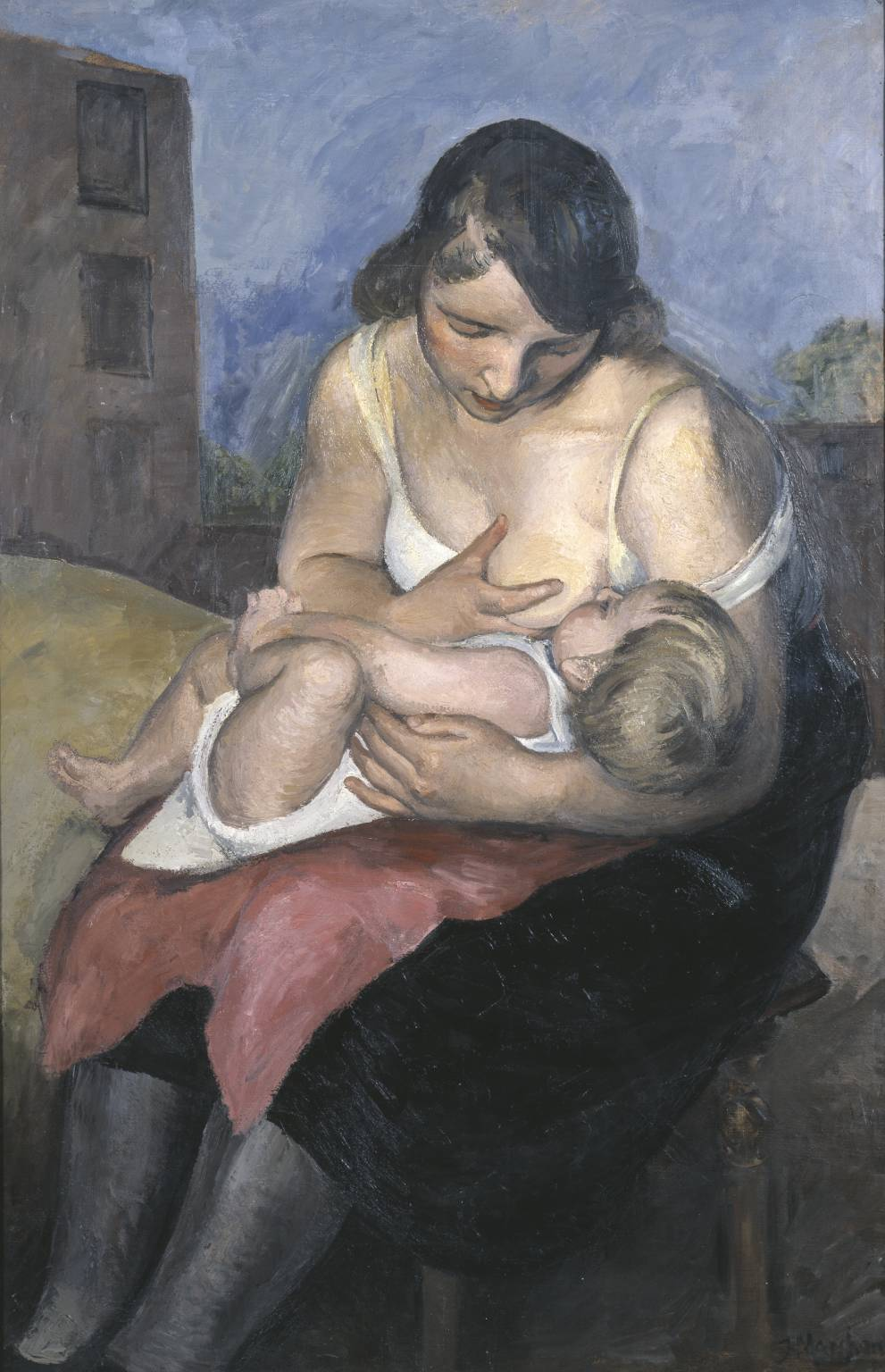
Maternity 1921

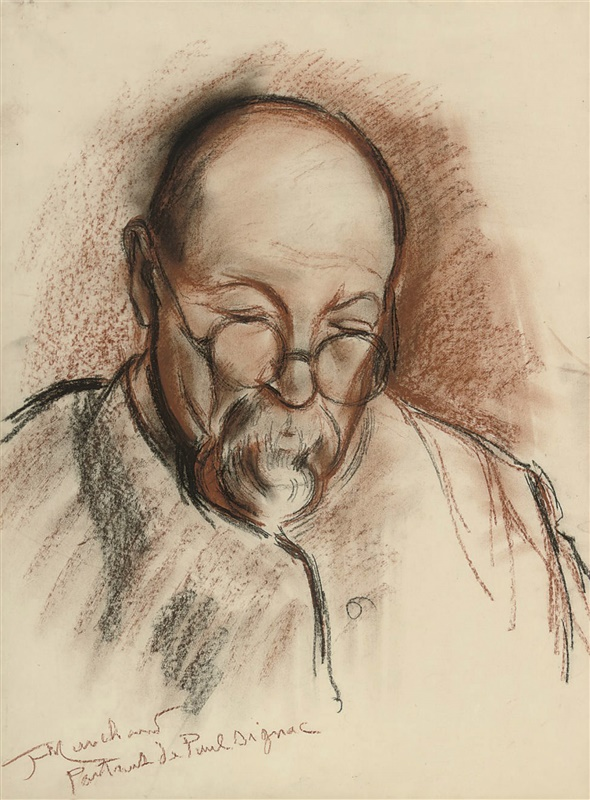
Paul Signac c.1930

== Illustrations ==
- Jean Cocteau, Bertrand Guégan (1892-1943); L'almanach de Cocagne pour l'an 1920-1922, Dédié aux vrais Gourmands Et aux Francs Buveurs
