= Paul-Émile Bécat =

French painter

Paul-Émile Bécat (French: [pɔl emil beka]; 2 February 1885 – 1 January 1960) was a French painter, printmaker and engraver, and was awarded first prize in the Prix de Rome in 1920. He was a student of Gabriel Ferrier and François Flameng and exhibitioned at the Salon de Paris in 1913. Returning from his travels to the Congo, Gabon, and the Sudan, he specialised from 1933 in the technique of drypoint in his erotic works. Today he is best known for his portraits of French writers, and his erotic works.

== Illustrative Work ==
- Pierre Louÿs, Aphrodite: mœurs antiques
- Pietro Aretino, Ragionamenti
- Brantôme, Vie des dames galantes
- Pierre Choderlos de Laclos, Les Liaisons dangereuses
- Paul Verlaine, Les amies
- François-Mathieu Mathieu-François Pidansat de Mairobert, La secte des anandrynes
- Voltaire, Le Taureau Blanc, La princesse de Babylone (1951)
