= Berthe Cazin =

French painter

- Born: 16 August 1872; Boulogne-sur-Mer (Pas-de-Calais)
- Died: 1 June 1971 (aged 98); Sèvres (Hauts-de-Seine)
- Known for: Painter, potter, goldsmith

Marie-Berthe Cazin (16 August 1872 in Boulogne-sur-Mer (Pas-de-Calais) – 1 June 1971 in Sèvres (Hauts-de-Seine)) was a French woman painter, potter, goldsmith.

== Biography ==
Marie-Berthe Cazin (née Yvart) was married to Jean-Marie Michel Cazin, and studied with his father, Jean-Charles Cazin. She produced mostly decorative works, such as vases and plates, working in ceramic, hammered copper and silver, leather, horn and other.

It is believed that she worked alongside Jean-Michel throughout his entire career in ceramics and that many of the vases signed Jean-Michel were actually made by Berthe. At some point she began to sign her ceramic work, which typically feature incised and relief floral decoration.

In 1913 she participated in the exposition with Henriette Tirman in Lyceum-Club.

== Other works ==
Marie-Berthe and her work are the subjects of a new British musical, In Clay, written by Rebecca Simmonds & Jack Miles. In Clay was workshop in 2022. It premiered in London at the VAULT Festival 2023. In August 2023 it was performed at The Other Palace in London. In March 2024 it ran at Upstairs at the Gatehouse in London in Highgate. December 22, 2025 it opened at the Signature Theater in Shirlington, Virginia. It opened January 23, 2026 at Broadway Rose in Tigard, Oregon. It opened at City Theater in Pittsburgh.

== Notes ==
- Bénézit, 1999: CAZIN, Marie Berthe (1872-1971)
