= The Luxembourg Station in Brussels =

1903 painting by Henri Ottmann

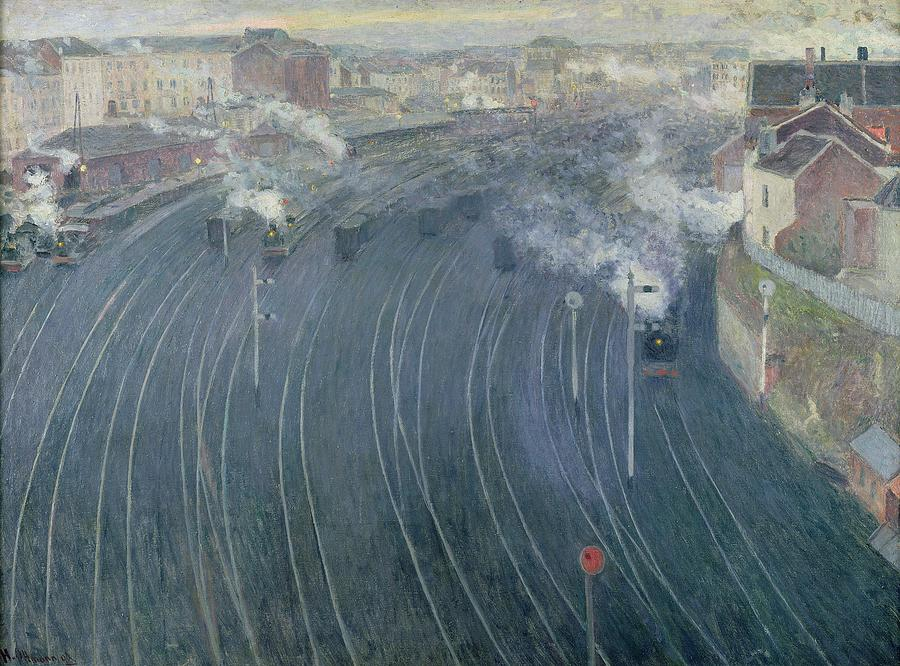
The Luxembourg Station in Brussels, 1903. Oil on canvas, H. 80; W. 110 cm. Musée d'Orsay, Paris

The Luxembourg Station in Brussels is a 1903 oil painting on canvas by the French painter Henri Ottmann. It is now in the Musée d'Orsay in Paris.

In the Salon of Free Aesthetics, Brussels, 1903, Henri Ottmann for the first time exhibited three views of the city's Luxembourg Station, picturing one weather condition for each view: wind, frost and fog. It is probable that the painting was one of these three.

The point of view is from a bridge which shadows the crossing train tracks. The signal stands just behind the frame; the painting shows its top. This motif is similar to Claude Monet's Track signals outside Saint-Lazare station, 1877 (Hanover, Lower Saxony State Museum). Ottmann was inspired by French Impressionists, particularly Pierre-Auguste Renoir.

This painting's depiction of a modern subject in an ornamental way is characteristic of Ottmann.
