= In Clay =

Solo musical

In Clay is a one-woman musical based on the life story of a French potter called Marie-Berthe Cazin, with book and lyrics written by Rebecca Simmonds and music and lyrics by Jack Miles.

It has been performed at VAULT Festival in London in 2023, at a concert performance at the Other Palace in 2023, at the Upstairs at the Gatehouse theatre in London in 2024, and had its American premiere at Signature Theatre in 2025. It was also presented at the National Alliance for Musical Theatre's Festival of New Musicals in 2024.

The song 'Talent', featured in the musical, was nominated for the Stiles & Drewe Best New Song Prize in 2023.

It has been nominated for seven Offies, including Best New Musical and Best Musical Production.
