= Gabriel Ferrier =

French painter

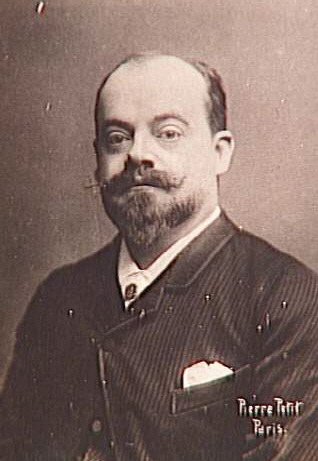
Ferrier photographed by Pierre Petit

Gabriel-Joseph-Marie-Augustin Ferrier (29 September 1847 – 6 June 1914) was a French portrait painter and orientalist.

== Early life and education ==
He was born in Nîmes. His father was a pharmacist. He began his studies at the École des Beaux-Arts, where he worked with Ernest Hébert and Isidore Pils.

== Career ==
His first exhibit was at the Salon in 1869. Two years later, he was awarded the Prix de Rome for his depiction of a scene from the Flood and studied at the French Academy in Rome from 1873 to 1876.

Upon returning to France, he specialized in painting portraits of notable figures connected with the Third Republic. In 1883, he took an extended trip to Algeria, where he created works in the Orientalist style. Some of those works earned him a Gold Medal at the Exposition Universelle in 1889.

He later was named a Professor of Design at the Maison d'éducation de la Légion d'honneur, then became a lecturer at the École des Beaux-arts, succeeding Jean-Léon Gérôme. He also taught at the Académie Julian. In 1906, he was elected to the Académie des Beaux-Arts. He was also a member of the Société des Artistes Français.

In 1911, he became a Knight in the Légion d'honneur. He died in 1914 in Paris.

Among his best-known students are Paul-Émile Bécat, Roger Bissière, André Fau, Luis Ricardo Falero, and Albert Lynch.

=== Selected paintings ===
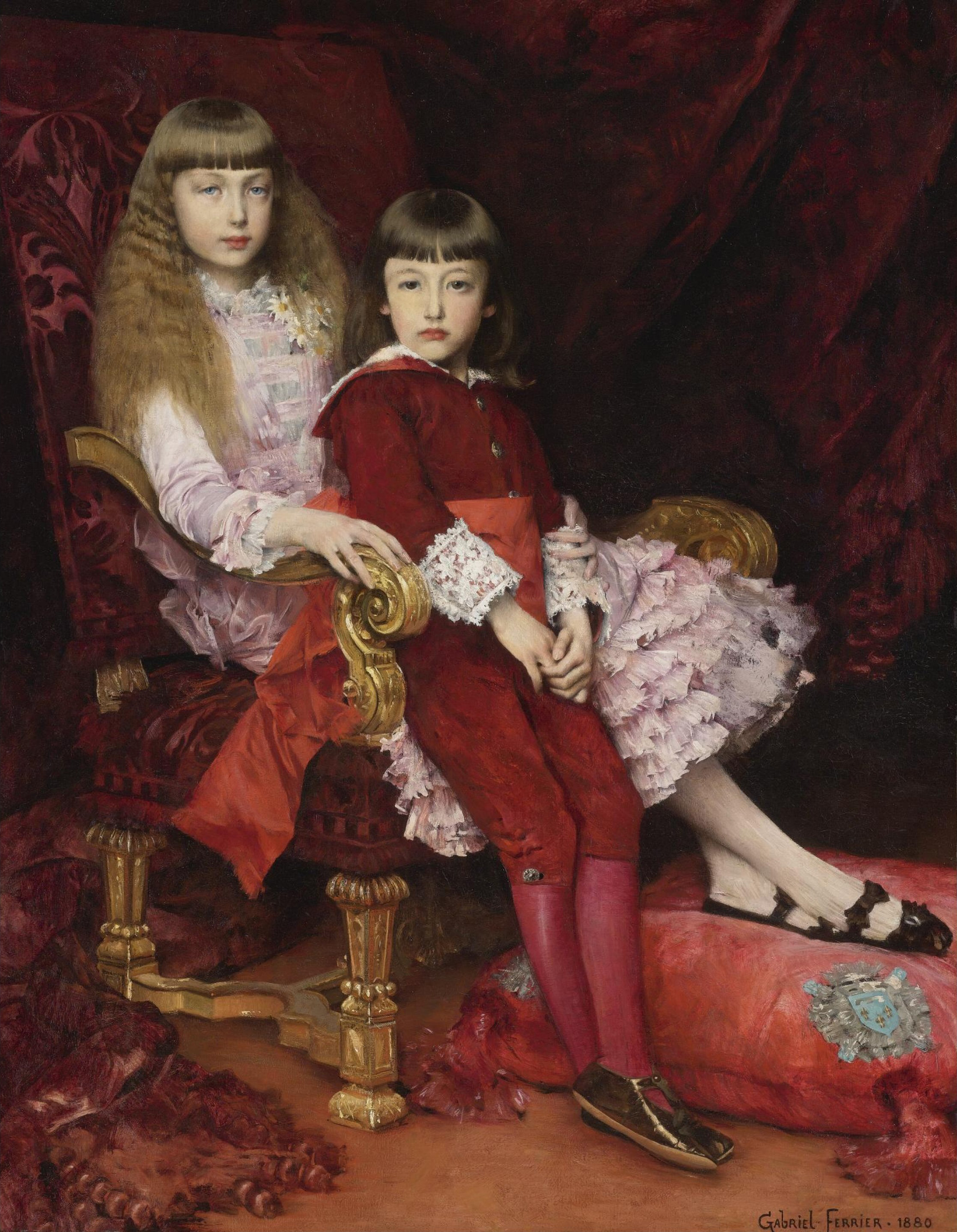
Princess Marguerite with Prince Jean of Orléans

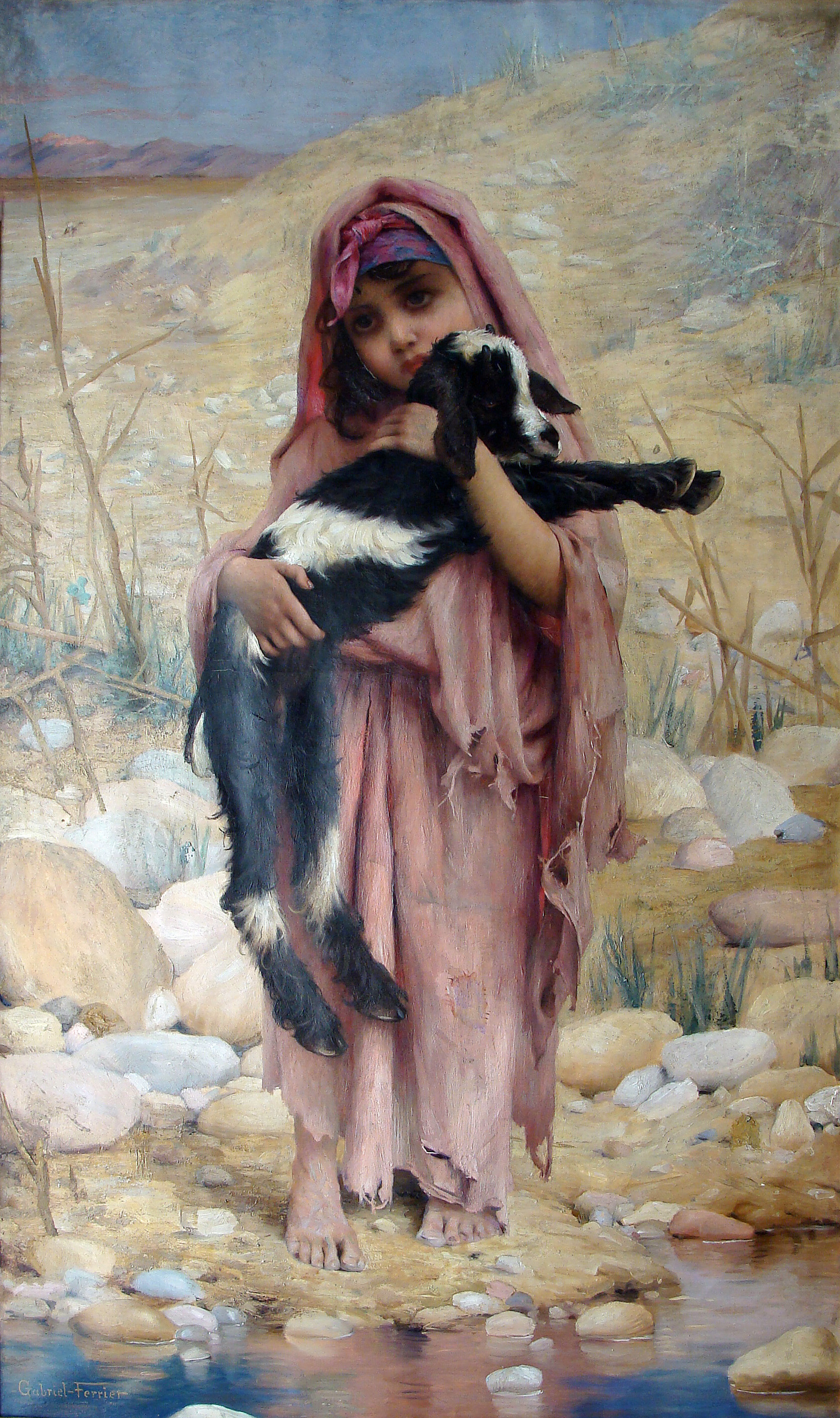
Young Algerian Shepherdess

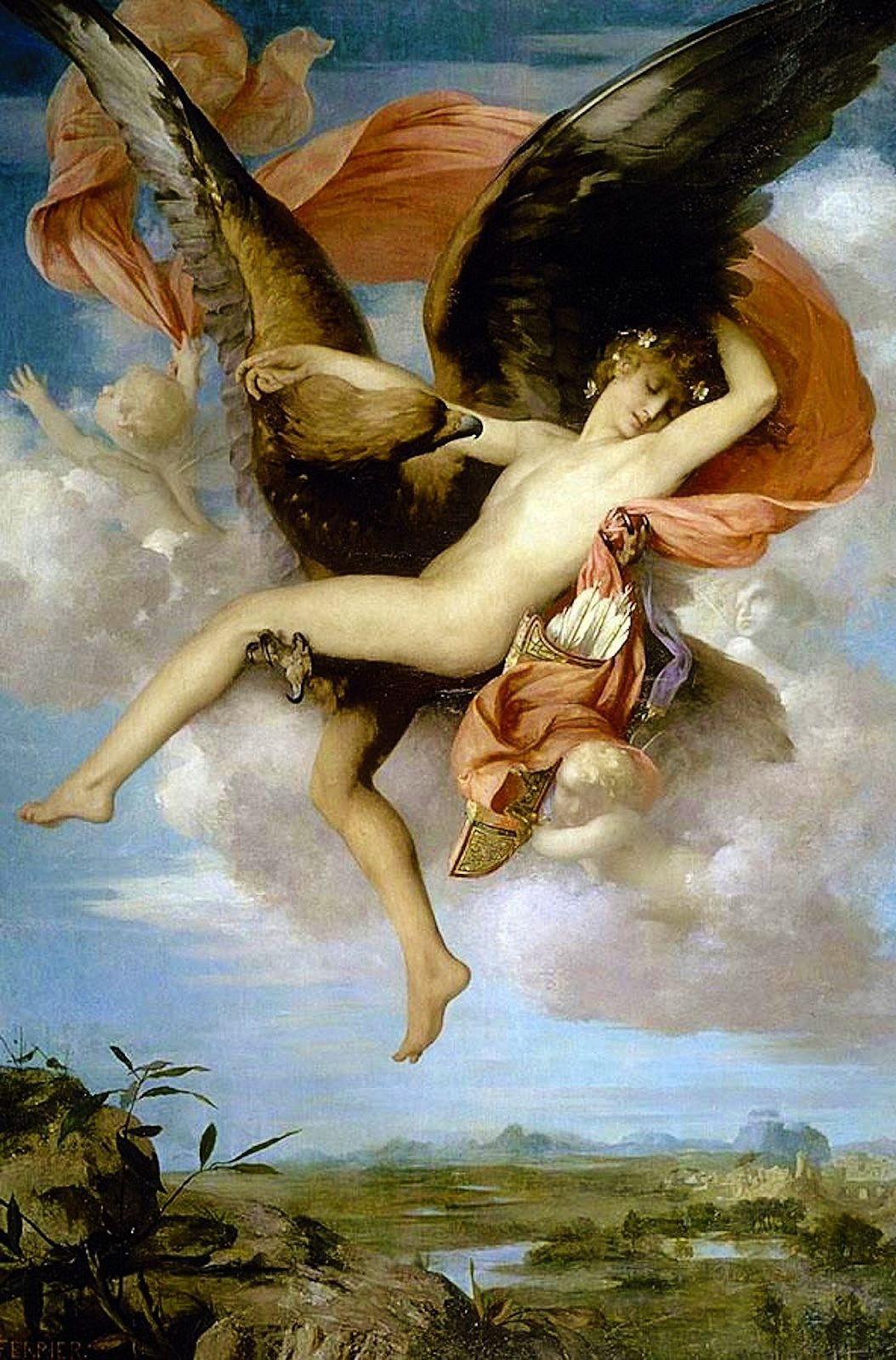
Ganymede

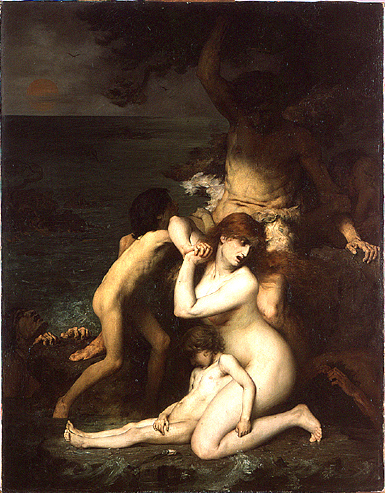
A Scene from the Flood

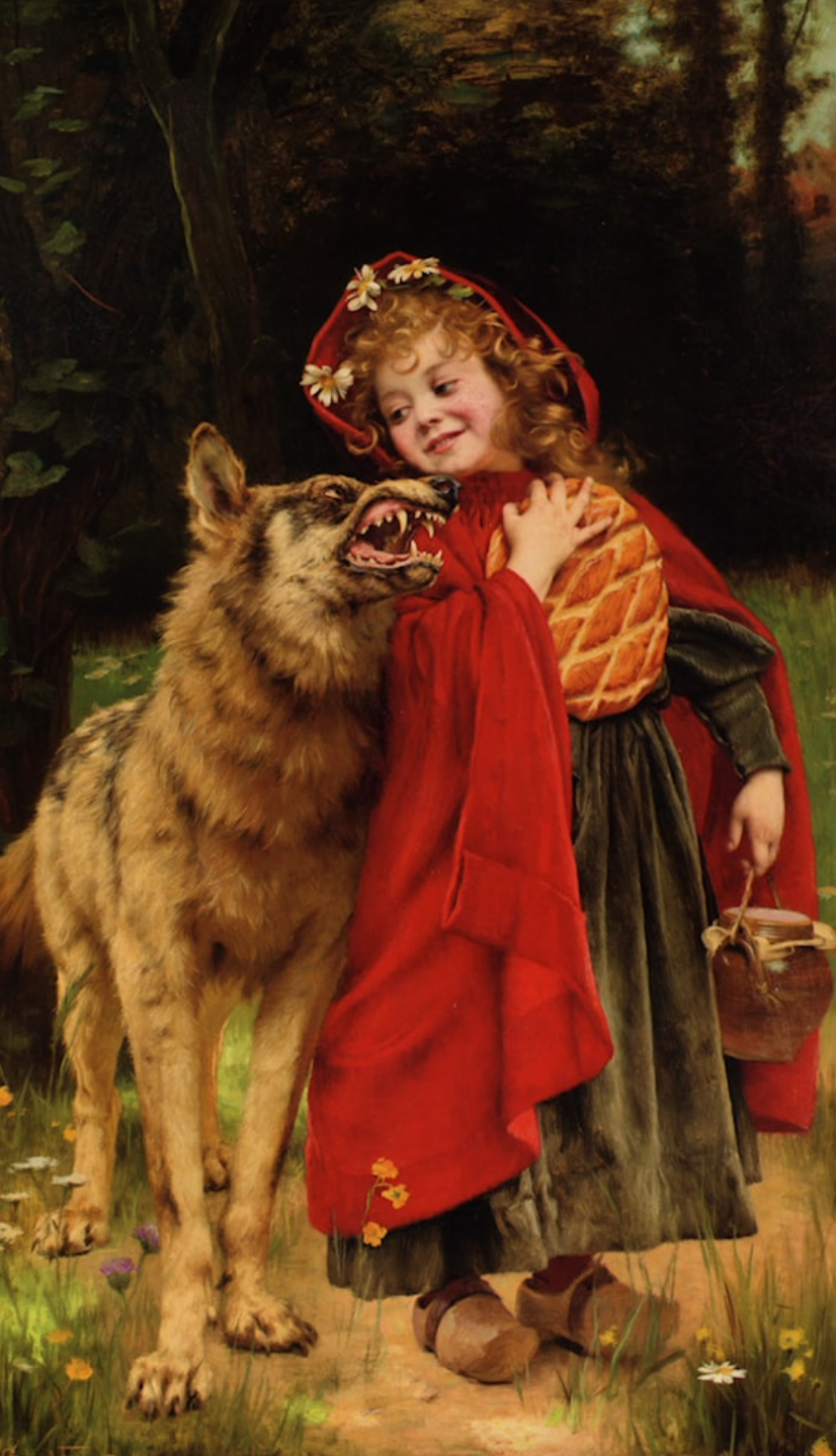
Little Red Riding Hood

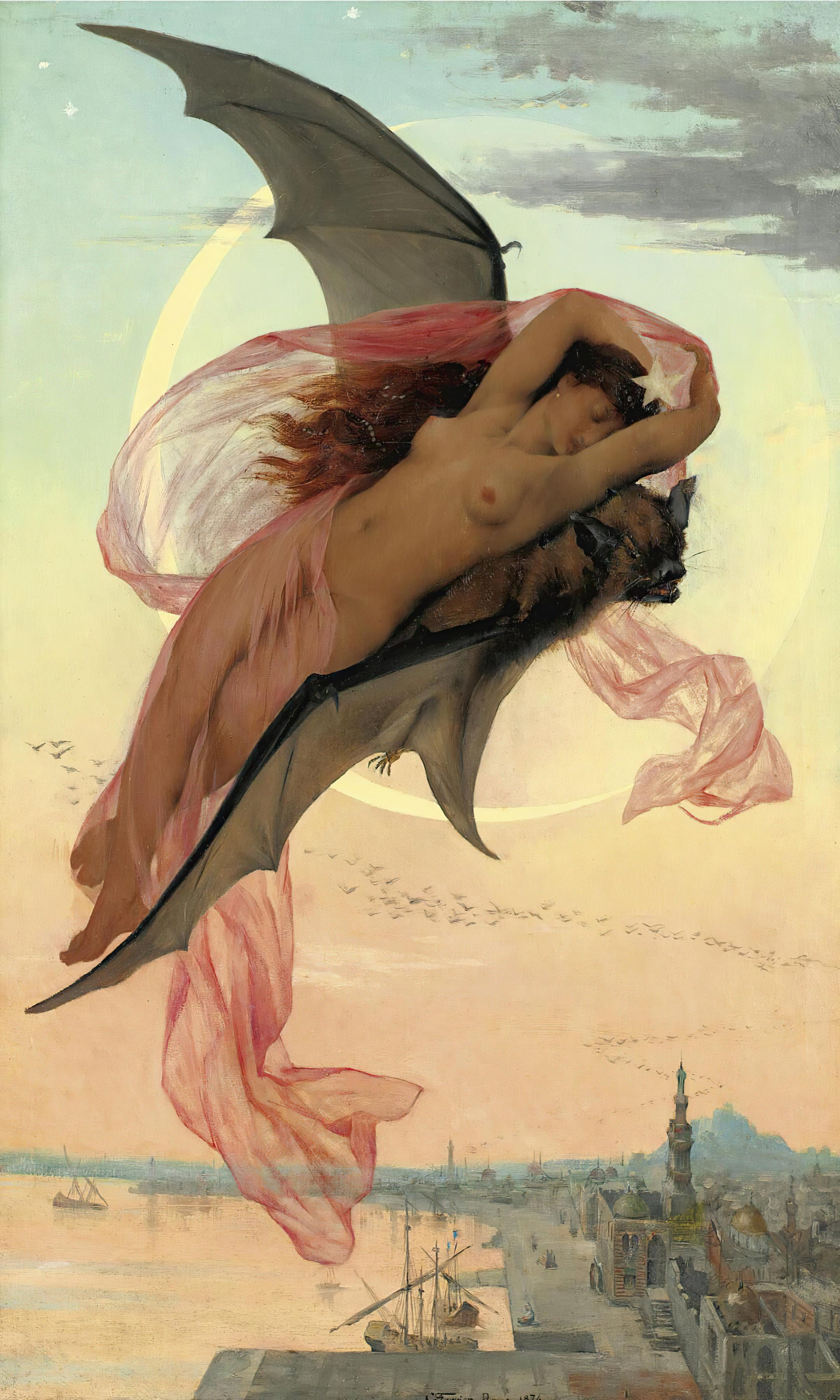
Moonlit dreams

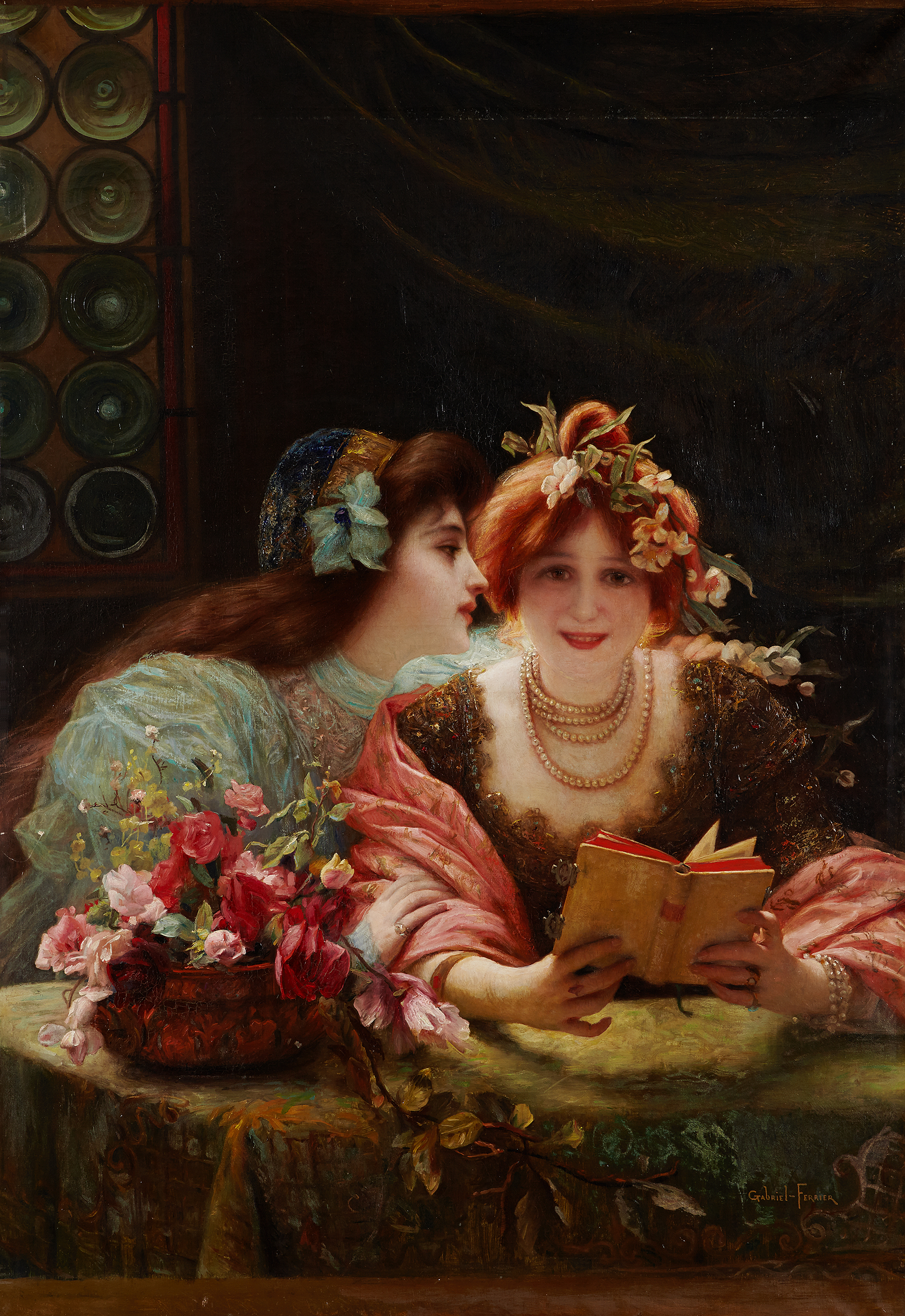
Whispers in the Library

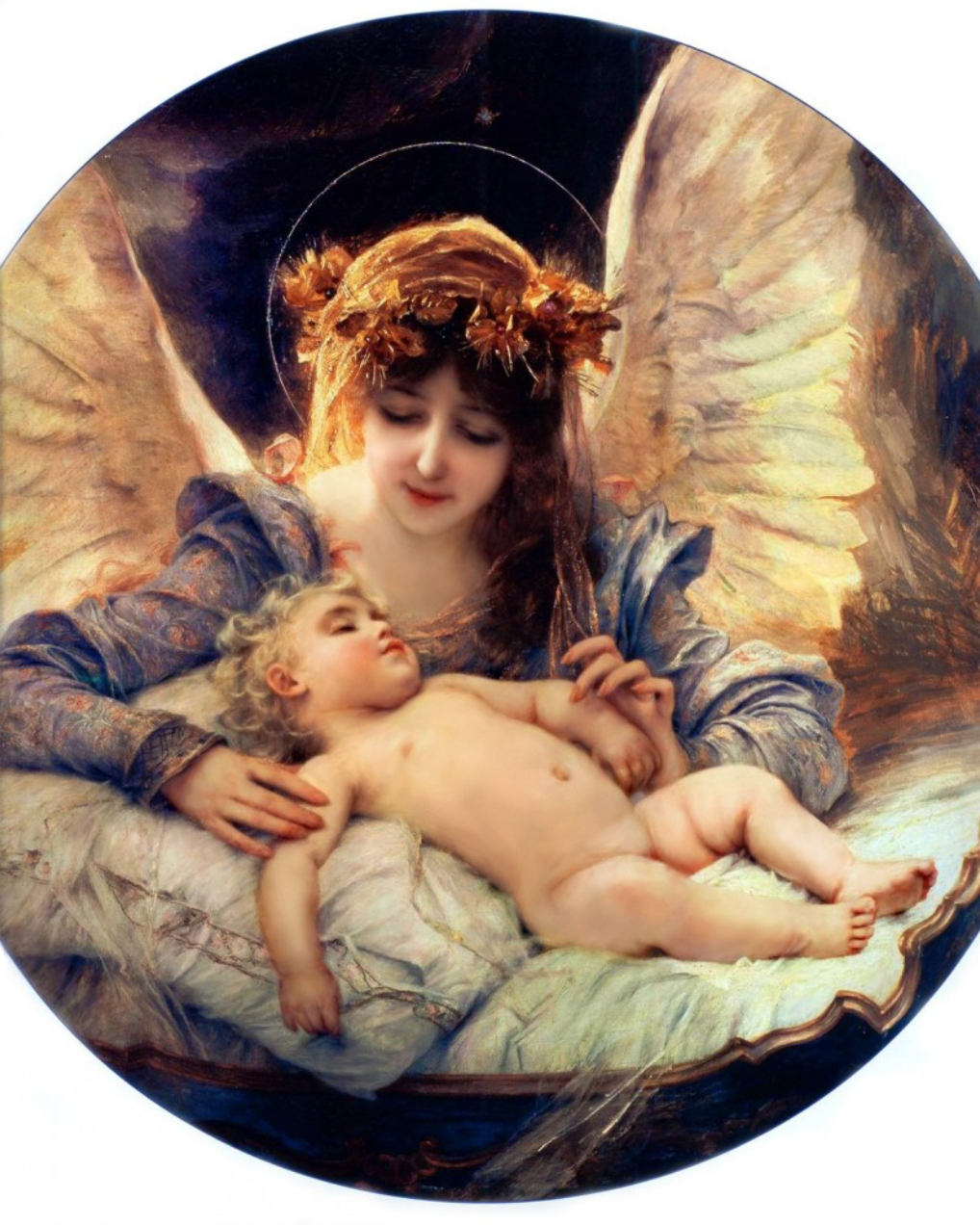
Guardian angel by Gabriel Ferrier

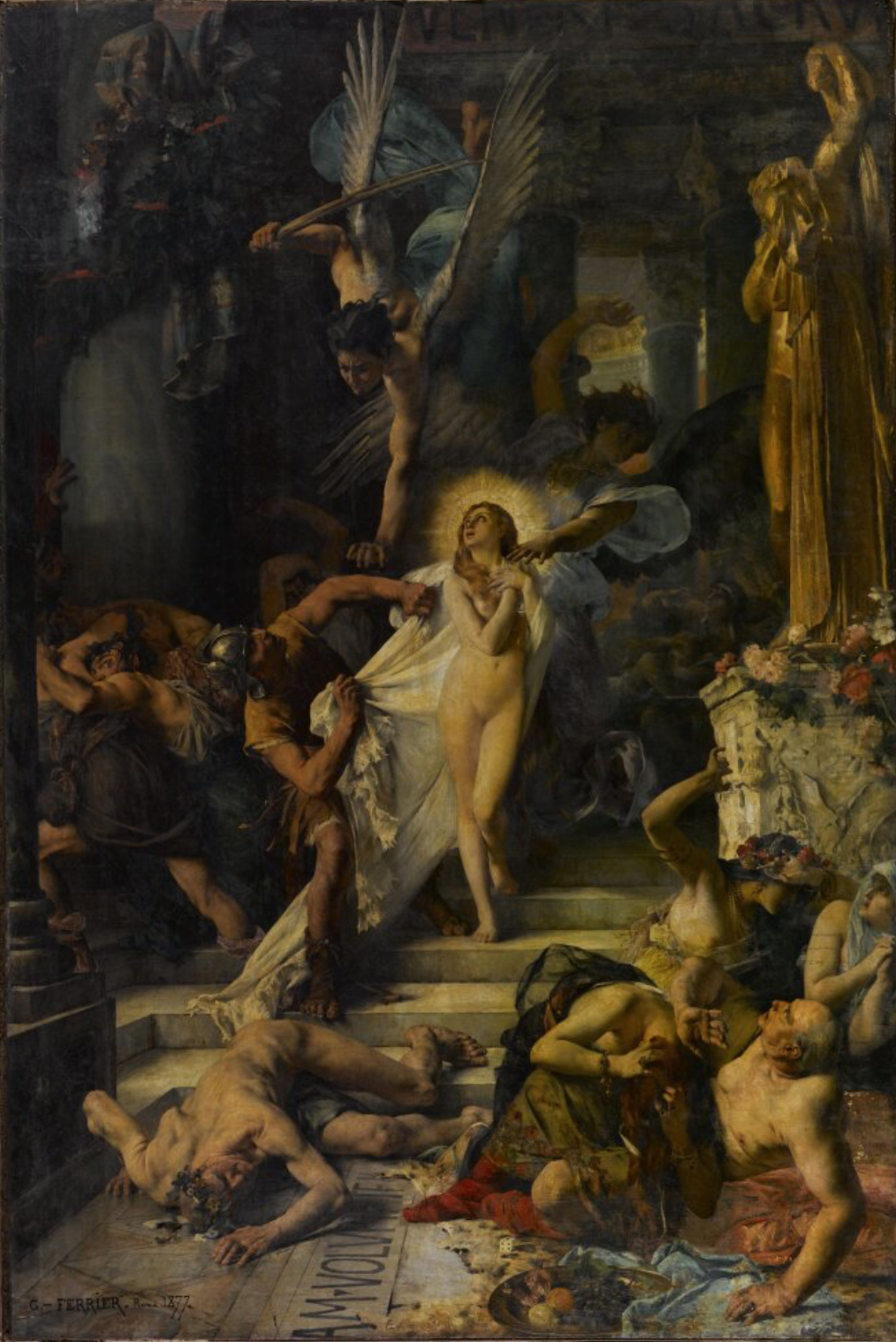
The Martyrdom of Saint Agnes
