= André Fau =

French painter

Fau, André
- Born: November 13, 1896; Paris
- Died: January 31, 1982
- Education: École nationale supérieure des Beaux-Arts; Gabriel Ferrier
- Known for: Painter, architect, ceramist, songwriter, poet.
- Movement: Cubism, Futurism, Art Deco
- Awards: National Order of the Legion of Honour, Cross of War, Médaille Militaire avec citations, Ordre des Palmes Académiques

André Fau (November 13, 1896, January 31, 1982) was a French post-Cubist artist, architect, ceramist, songwriter, and poet born in Paris.

== Biography ==
Fau studied decorative arts at the École des Beaux-Arts and under Gabriel Ferrier.

Since 1919 dedicated himself to literature. In 1920 he founded a book association, Young Songs, at Gozlin street, Saint Germain des Prés.

From 1921 to 1932 he was especially active as a ceramic artist. André Fau had patents on inventions in decorative art that got widely popular, were published and especially appreciated in Japan. He also became the youngest juror of the decorative art exposition. He created crystal objects models for a Czech factory. During this period, famous composers of the time wrote songs based on his lyrics.

In the 1930s during an economic crisis he and some friends assisted artists in a manner rather unusual for that time by opening an exposition sale on the walls of the bar “Bar efte” (Le Rond-Point des Artistes, 5. r. du Metz).

In 1944 he published a significant work, Montmartre village de Paris. This book contains 25 watercolors where Fau expressed his tender love to Montmartre. The book was a great success and it completed collections of bibliophiles.

In France, Sweden, America, Japan and in the whole world André Fau exhibited his works along with famous artists such as Pablo Picasso, André Dunoyer de Segonzac, Raoul Dufy, Yves Brayer and many others.

In 1982 André Fau’s works were presented on the exhibition “Les Peintres indépendants de Montmartre 1920-1940” along with works of Maurice Utrillo, Suzanne Valadon, Gen Paul, Marcel Leprin, Edmond Heuze, Max Jacob, Élisée Maclet, Jules Pascin, Louis Marcoussis, Charles Camoin, Gus Bofa, Chas Laborde and others.

== Family ==
Wife Suzanne-Marie-Thérèse Denglos-Fau (1922–2002), а writer and a poet. The difference in age of this married couple was almost 26 years. Despite that their relationship became an illustration of elite art marriages of Montmartre.
