= Charles Camoin =

French expressionist painter (1879–1965)

Charles Camoin (French: [ʃaʁl kamwɛ̃]; 23 September 1879 – 20 May 1965) was a French expressionist landscape painter associated with the Fauves.

== History ==
Born in Marseille, France, Camoin met Henri Matisse in Gustave Moreau's class at the École des Beaux-Arts in Paris. Matisse and his friends (including Camoin, Henri Manguin, Albert Marquet, Georges Rouault, André Derain and Maurice de Vlaminck) formed the original group of artists labeled the Fauves (meaning "the wild beasts") for their wild, expressionist-like use of color. Camoin always remained close to Matisse. He painted a portrait of Matisse, which is in the permanent collection of the Pompidou Museum in Paris.

Charles Camoin's works have been widely shown in France and are in such major collections as the Musée d'Art Moderne de la ville de Paris in addition to the Centre Georges Pompidou and many of the French regional museums. In 1955, he was awarded the Prix du Président de la République at the Biennale of Menton. He died in Paris on 20 May 1965.

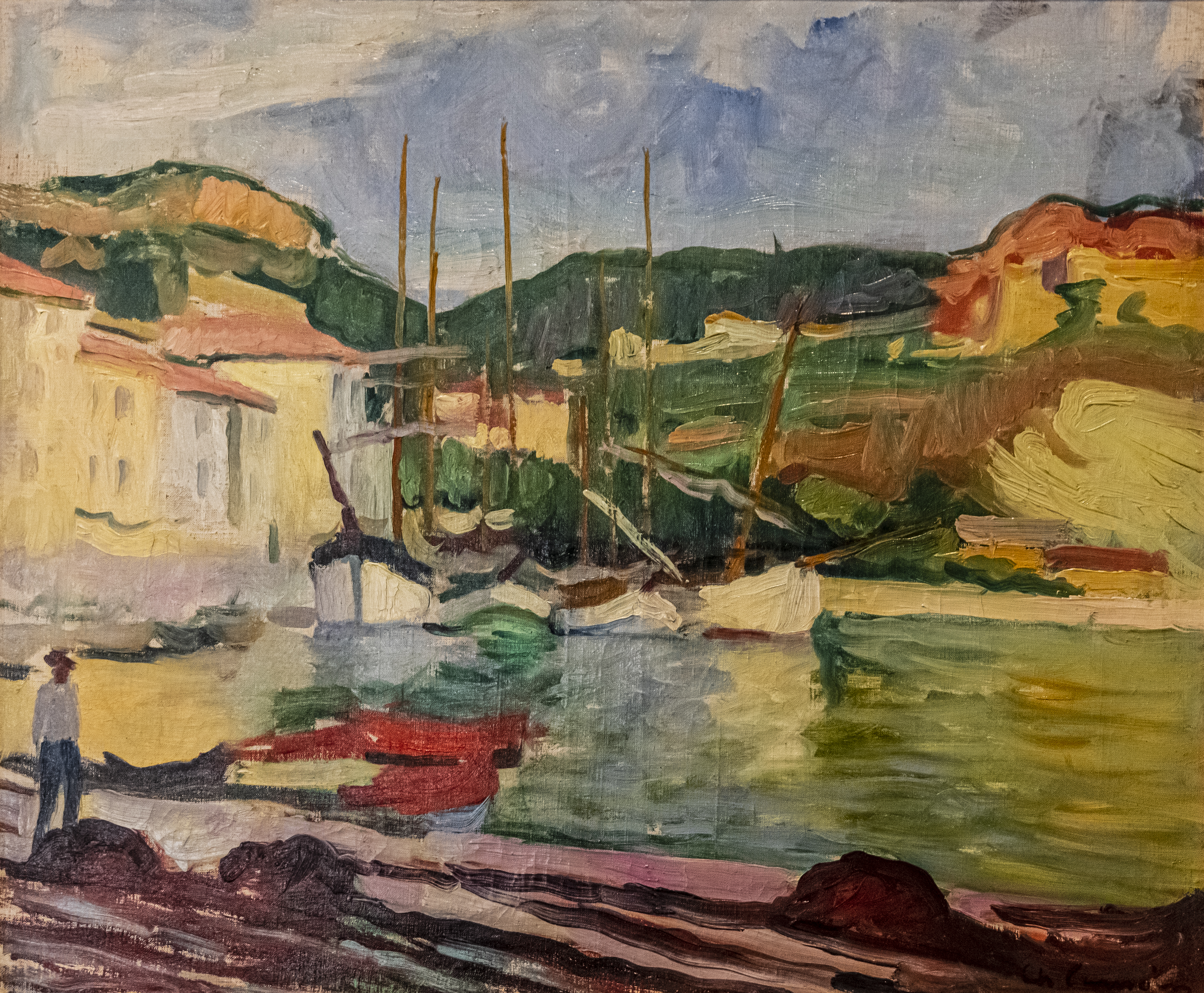
The Port of Cassis (Sunrise) (1905) - Bemberg Foundation Toulouse

La Petite Lina (1907) - Le Musée Cantini, Marseille, Oil on canvas, 66 x 55 cm. Le Musée Cantini, Marseille.
