= Maurice de Vlaminck =

French painter (1876–1958)

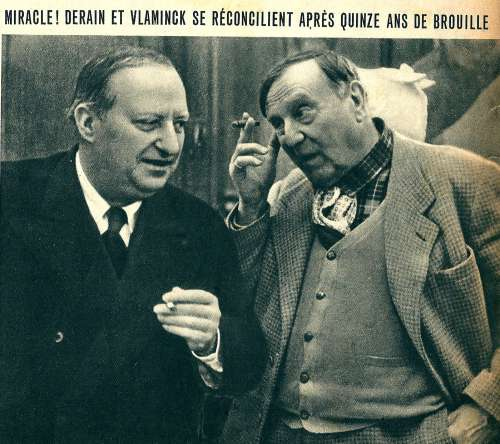
- Maurice Vlaminck (right) with André Derain (left), in 1942
- Born: 4 April 1876; Paris, France
- Died: 11 October 1958 (aged 82); Rueil-la-Gadelière, France
- Known for: Painting
- Movement: Fauvism

Maurice de Vlaminck (French: [vlamɛ̃k]; 4 April 1876 – 11 October 1958) was a French painter. Along with André Derain and Henri Matisse, he is considered one of the principal figures in the Fauve movement, a group of modern artists who from 1904 to 1908 were united in their use of intense colour. Vlaminck was one of the Fauves at the controversial Salon d'Automne exhibition of 1905.

== Life ==
The River Seine at Chatou, 1906, Metropolitan Museum of Art

Maurice de Vlaminck was born on Rue Pierre Lescot in Paris. His father Edmond Julien was Flemish and taught violin and his mother Joséphine Caroline Grillet came from Lorraine and taught piano. His father taught him to play the violin. He began painting in his late teens. In 1893, he studied with a painter named Henri Rigalon on the Île de Chatou. In 1894 he married Suzanne Berly. The turning point in his life was a chance meeting on the train to Paris towards the end of his stint in the army. Vlaminck, then 23 and already active in anarchist circles in Paris, met an aspiring artist, André Derain, with whom he struck up a lifelong friendship. When Vlaminck completed his army service in 1900, the two rented a studio together, the Maison Levanneur, which now houses the Cneai, for a year before Derain left to do his own military service. In 1902 and 1903 he wrote several mildly pornographic novels illustrated by Derain. He painted during the day and earned his livelihood by giving violin lessons and performing with musical bands at night.

Barges on the Seine (Bateaux sur la Seine), 1905-06, oil on canvas, 81 x 100 cm, Pushkin Museum, Moscow

Le bassin à Chatou (White Sailboat at Chatou), 1907, oil on canvas, 60.2 x 73.7 cm, private collection

Vlaminck participated in the controversial 1905 Salon d'Automne exhibition. After viewing the boldly colored canvases of Vlaminck, Henri Matisse, André Derain, Albert Marquet, Kees van Dongen, Charles Camoin, and Jean Puy, the art critic Louis Vauxcelles disparaged the painters as "fauves" (wild beasts), thus giving their movement the name by which it became known, Fauvism.

In 1911, Vlaminck traveled to London and painted by the Thames. In 1913, he painted again with Derain in Marseille and Martigues. In World War I he was stationed in Paris, and began writing poetry. Eventually he settled in Rueil-la-Gadelière, a small village south-west of Paris. He married his second wife, Berthe Combes, with whom he had two daughters. From 1925 he traveled throughout France, but continued to paint primarily along the Seine, near Paris. Resentful that Fauvism had been overtaken by Cubism as an art movement, Vlaminck blamed Picasso "for dragging French painting into a wretched dead end and state of confusion". During the Second World War, Vlaminck visited Nazi Germany and on his return published a tirade against Picasso and Cubism in the periodical Comoedia in June 1942. Vlaminck wrote many autobiographies.

Vlaminck died in Rueil-la-Gadelière on 11 October 1958.

== Artistic career ==
Town on the Bank of a Lake, c.1909, oil on canvas, 81.3 x 100.3 cm, Hermitage Museum, Saint Petersburg

Le pont de Poissy, c.1910, oil on canvas, 46.4 x 54.9 cm

Village, c.1912, oil on canvas, 73.7 x 92.1 cm (29 x 36 1/4 in.), Art Institute of Chicago

Two of Vlaminck's groundbreaking paintings, Sur le zinc (At the Bar) and L'homme a la pipe (Man Smoking a Pipe) were painted in 1900.

For the next few years Vlaminck lived in or near Chatou (the inspiration for his painting houses at Chatou), painting and exhibiting alongside Derain, Matisse, and other Fauvist painters. At this time his exuberant paint application and vibrant use of colour displayed the influence of Vincent van Gogh. Sur le zinc called to mind the work of Toulouse-Lautrec and his portrayals of prostitutes and solitary drinkers, but does not attempt to probe the sitter's psychology—a break with the century-old European tradition of individualized portraiture. According to art critic Souren Melikian, it is "the impersonal cartoon of a type." In his landscape paintings, his approach was similar. He ignored the details, with the landscape becoming a vehicle through which he could express mood through violent colour and brushwork. An example is Sous bois, painted in 1904. The following year, he began to experiment with "deconstruction," turning the physical world into dabs and streaks of colour that convey a sense of motion. His paintings Le Pont de Chatou (The Chatou Bridge), Les Ramasseurs de pommes de terre (The Potato Pickers), La Seine a Chatou (The River Seine at Chatou) and Le Verger (The Orchard) exemplify this trend.

== Artistic influences ==
Vlaminck's compositions show familiarity with the Impressionists, several of whom had painted in the same area in the 1870s and 1880s. After visiting a Van Gogh exhibit, he declared that he "loved Van Gogh that day more than my own father". From 1908 his palette grew deeper and richer in color, and the predominant influence was that of Cézanne. His later work displayed a darker palette, punctuated by heavy strokes of impasto contrasting with subtle blending and vibrant color temperature relations.

Some of his works are held at the Minneapolis Institute of Art.
