= Bagnolet =

- Commune
- The Mercurial Towers and Hôtel de Ville, in 2004

- Coat of arms

- Location (in red) within Paris inner suburbs
- Location of Bagnolet
- Location within France Location within Île-de-France (region)
- Coordinates: 48°52′09″N 2°25′05″E
- Country: France
- Region: Île-de-France
- Department: Seine-Saint-Denis
- Arrondissement: Bobigny
- Canton: Bagnolet
- Intercommunality: Grand Paris

Government
  - Mayor (2026–32): Edouard Denouel
- Area^{1}: 2.57 km^{2} (0.99 sq mi)
- Highest elevation: 119 m (390 ft)
- Lowest elevation: 57 m (187 ft)
- Population (2023): 43,086
  - Density: 16,800/km^{2} (43,400/sq mi)
- Time zone: UTC+01:00 (CET)
  - Summer (DST): UTC+02:00 (CEST)
- INSEE/Postal code: 93006 /93170
- ^{1} French Land Register data, which excludes lakes, ponds, glaciers > 1 km^{2} (0.386 sq mi or 247 acres) and river estuaries.

Bagnolet (French pronunciation: [baɲɔlɛ]) is a commune in the eastern suburbs of Paris, France. It is located 5.2 km (3.2 mi) from the center of Paris.

== History ==
In Medieval times, Bagnolet was known as Balneolum, a Latin term meaning “bath”, referring to an ancient bathing place in the area.

On 1 January 1860, the city of Paris was enlarged by annexing neighboring communes. On that occasion, a small part of the commune of Bagnolet was annexed to the city of Paris. At the same time, the commune of Charonne was disbanded and divided between the city of Paris, Bagnolet, and Montreuil. Bagnolet received a small part of the territory of Charonne.

On 24 July 1867, a part of the territory of Bagnolet was detached and merged with a part of the territory of Romainville and a part of the territory of Pantin to create the commune of Les Lilas.

The town used to be the home of the Château de Bagnolet. The Hôtel de Ville was completed in 1881.

== Population ==
Its inhabitants are called Bagnoletais in French.

Historical population

Year	Pop.	±% p.a.
1793	1,043	—
1800	953	−1.28%
1806	987	+0.59%
1821	878	−0.78%
1831	1,093	+2.21%
1836	1,090	−0.05%
1841	1,321	+3.92%
1846	1,327	+0.09%
1851	1,298	−0.44%
1856	1,556	+3.69%
1861	2,553	+10.41%
1866	2,924	+2.75%
1872	2,597	−1.96%
1876	2,861	+2.45%
1881	3,839	+6.06%
1886	5,280	+6.58%
1891	6,124	+3.01%
1896	7,116	+3.05%
1901	8,799	+4.34%

Year	Pop.	±% p.a.
1906	11,770	+5.99%
1911	15,744	+5.99%
1921	20,406	+2.63%
1926	26,538	+5.40%
1931	28,112	+1.16%
1936	28,052	−0.04%
1946	25,059	−1.12%
1954	26,779	+0.83%
1962	31,591	+2.09%
1968	34,054	+1.26%
1975	35,906	+0.76%
1982	32,557	−1.39%
1990	32,600	+0.02%
1999	32,511	−0.03%
2007	34,269	+0.66%
2012	34,920	+0.38%
2017	35,674	+0.43%
2023	43,086	+3.20%

Source: EHESS and INSEE (1968-2023)

== Transport ==
Bagnolet is served by Gallieni station on Paris Metro line 3 and RATP buslines 76,102,115,122,318 545.

International and National coaches serve Bagnolet at Gallieni Metro station.

== Notable people ==
- Jeanne-Marie Barbey (1876–1960), artist and photographer
- Sylvain Distin (born 1977), footballer
- Koffi Djidji (born 1992), footballer
- Cyril Kongo (born 1969), French graffiti artist
- Solomon Loubao (born 2005), French footballer
- Henri Verneuil (1920–2002), filmmaker

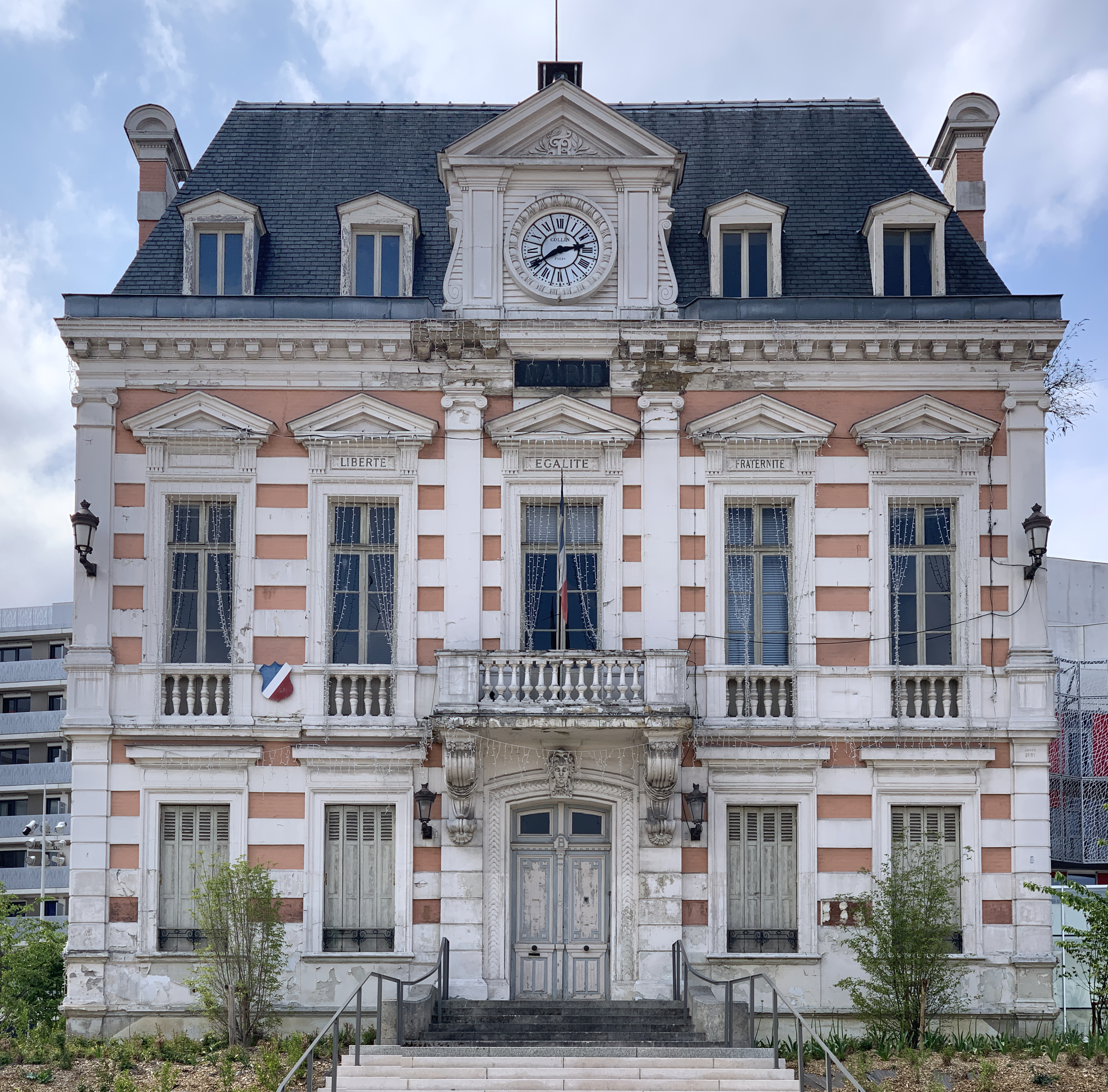
The Hôtel de Ville

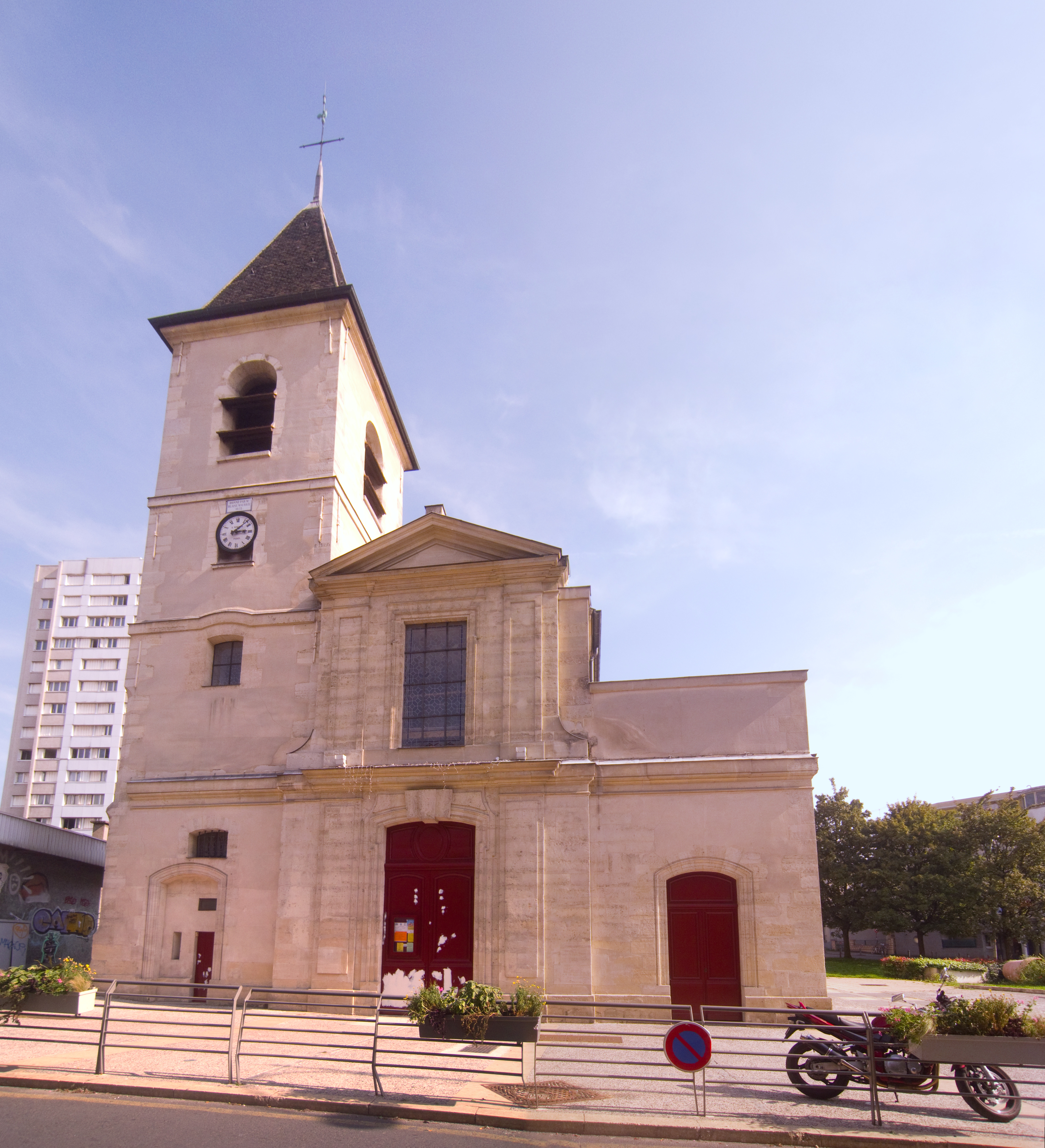
Church Saint-Leu-Saint-Gilles.

== Education ==
The commune has ten public preschools (maternelles), nine public elementary schools, two public junior high schools (collèges), and a comprehensive public senior high school (lycée polyvalent).

- Junior high schools: Georges-Politzer and Travail / Langevin
- Lycée général et professionnel Eugène-Hénaff

There is a private junior and high school, Lycée professionnel et technologique Saint-Besnoît de l'Europe.

== International relations ==
Bagnolet is twinned with:

- Akbou, Algeria
- Massala, Mali
- Oranienburg, Germany
- Le Robert, Martinique, France
- Shatila, Lebanon
- Sesto Fiorentino, Italy

== See also ==
- Communes of the Seine-Saint-Denis department
