= Société des Artistes Indépendants =

French artists' salon and exhibiting space

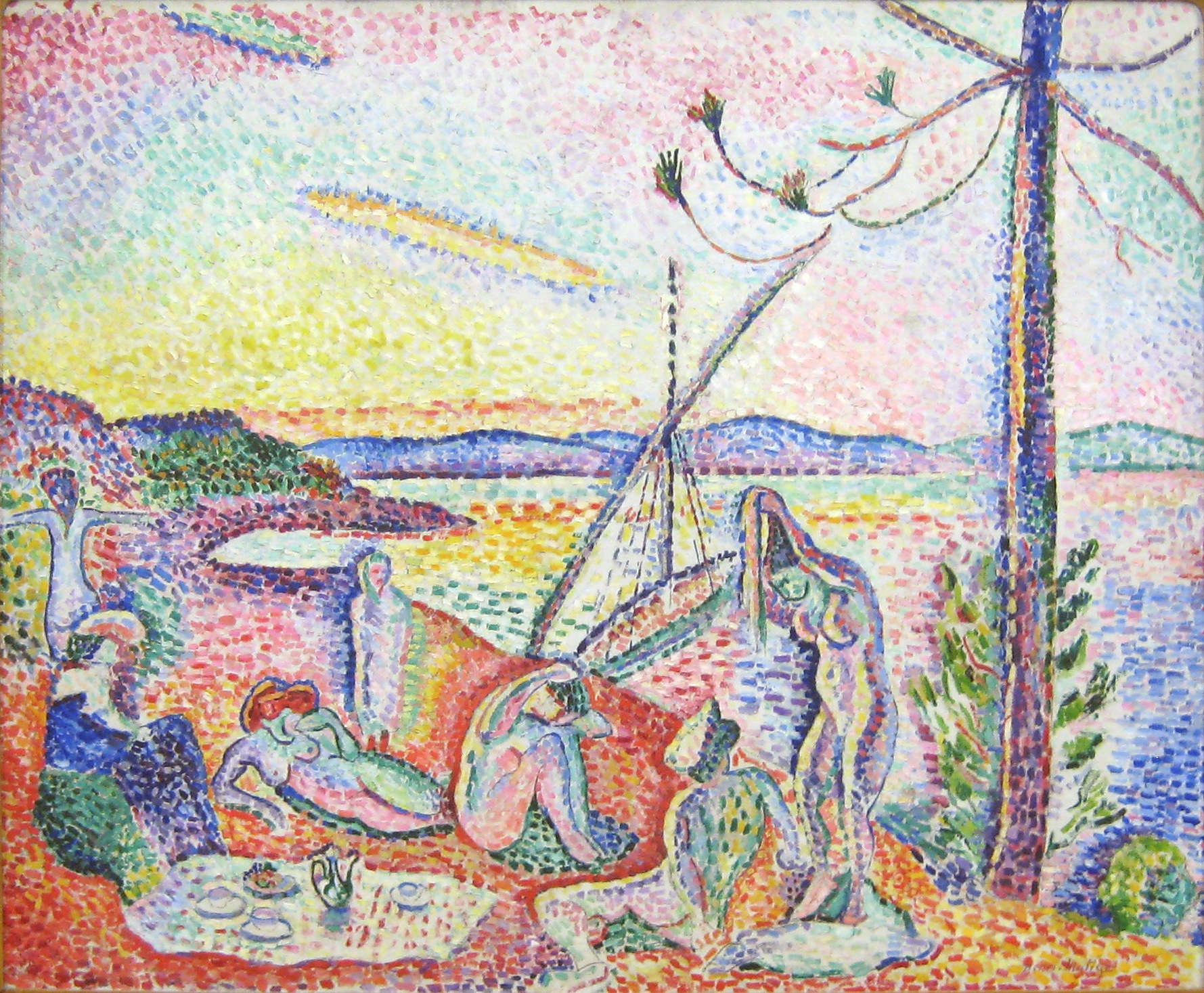
Henri Matisse, 1904, Luxe, Calme et Volupté, oil on canvas, 98.5 cm × 118.5 cm (38.8 in × 46.7 in), Musée d'Orsay, Paris. Exhibited at the Salon des Indépendants, 1905

The Société des Artistes Indépendants (French pronunciation: [sɔsjete dez‿aʁtist(z‿)ɛ̃depɑ̃dɑ̃], Society of Independent Artists) or Salon des Indépendants (pronounced [salɔ̃ dez ͜ ɛ̃depɑ̃dɑ̃]) was formed in Paris on 29 July 1884. The association began with the organization of massive exhibitions in Paris, choosing the slogan "sans jury ni récompense" ("without jury nor reward"). Albert Dubois-Pillet, Odilon Redon, Georges Seurat and Paul Signac were among its founders. For the following three decades their annual exhibitions set the trends in art of the early 20th century, along with the Salon d'Automne. This is where artworks were often first displayed and widely discussed. World War I brought a closure to the salon, though the Artistes Indépendants remained active. Since 1920, the headquarters has been located in the vast basements of the Grand Palais (next door to the Société des Artistes Français, the Société Nationale des Beaux-Arts, the Société du Salon d'Automne, and others).

== History ==
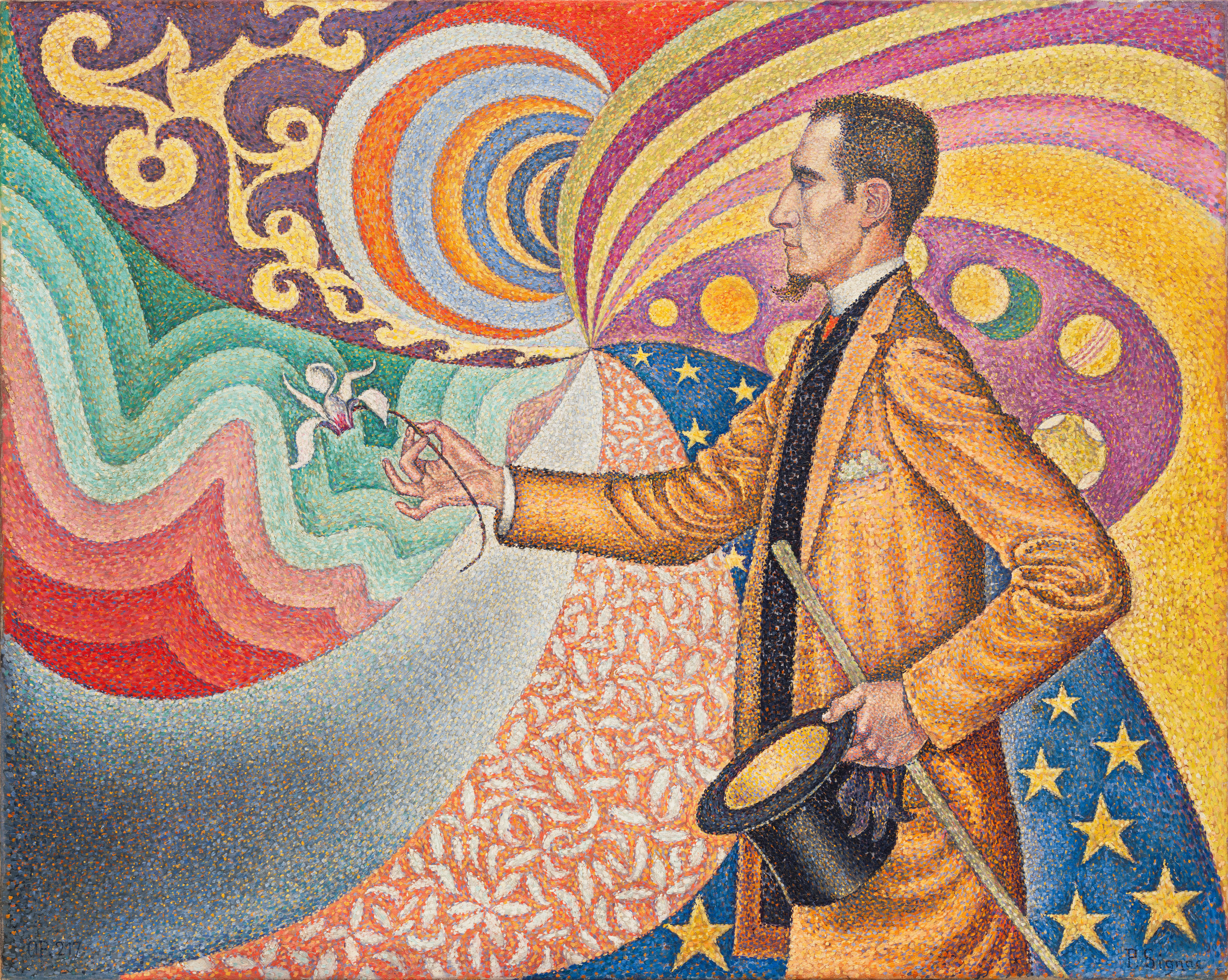
Paul Signac, 1890, Opus 217. Against the Enamel of a Background Rhythmic with Beats and Angles, Tones, and Tints, Portrait of M. Félix Fénéon in 1890, oil on canvas, 73.5 x 92.5 cm, Museum of Modern Art, New York City

The Salon des Indépendants (Salon des Artistes Indépendants) is an annual independent art exhibition aimed at a large audience that takes place in Paris. It was established in response to the rigid traditionalism of the official government-sponsored Salon. Since the first exhibition of 1884, at the Pavilion de la ville de Paris (Champs-Élysées), the organizing Société des Artistes Indépendants has vowed to bring together the works of artists claiming a certain independence in their art. The event is characterized by the absence of both awards and a selection jury. There are however placement or hanging committees. In contrast to the Salon d'Automne, which takes place in Paris during autumn months, the Indépendants is held during the springtime, inspiring artistic production during winter months, as artists prepare for the show. Several important dates have marked the history of the salon.

During the Second Empire, artists not backed by the official Académie de peinture et de sculpture in charge of the exhibits at the annual Salon or without support supplied by actual political constellations had little chance to advance. From year to year the number of artists working in Paris, the number of artists submitting works to the official Salon and the number of works refused by the jury increased, but neither the Second Empire nor the Third Republic found an answer to this situation.

For years, the artists had counted on official support. In 1884, finally, the artists began to organise themselves, and a "Group of independent artists" was authorised by the Ministry of Fine Arts to arrange an exhibition, while the City of Paris agreed to supply rooms for the presentation. So, from May 15 through July 15, the first "free" exhibition of contemporary art showed more than 5000 works by more than 400 artists.

Although sustained by Mesureur, deputy chairman of the Council of Paris and Grand Master of the Grand Lodge of France, by Frédéric Hattat, chairman of the Fine Art commission in the same council, and by Albert Dubois-Pillet, commanding the Republican Guard, member of the Grand Orient de France, the beginnings of the company, considered a nest of revolutionaries, were difficult.

=== Establishment ===
June 11, 1884, Maître Coursault, notary at Montmorency, Val-d'Oise, officially confirmed the establishment of the Société

Article 1 of the organization's statutes reads,

...the purpose of Société des Artistes Indépendants – based on the principle of abolishing admission jury – is to allow the artists to present their works to public judgement with complete freedom.

=== Groupe vs. Société ===
Members of the Groupe challenged this foundation and succeeded in arranging an exhibition "for the victims of the recent cholera epidemic", inaugurated December 1, 1884, by Lucien Boué, President of the Paris City Council. Financially, however, the result was a catastrophe. Nevertheless, in spring 1885, the "Groupe" organised its next exhibition, this time with some success.

== Early exhibitions ==
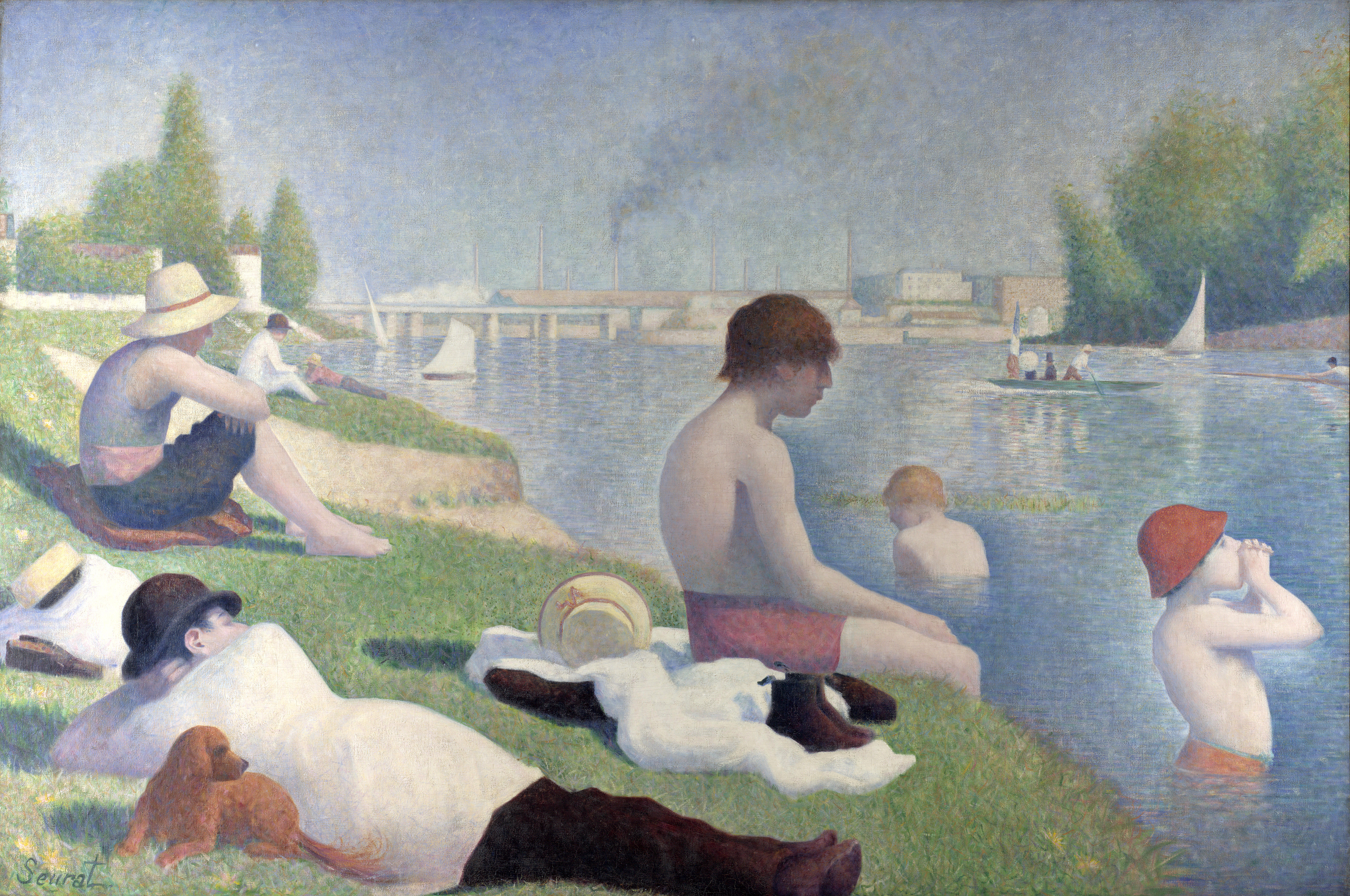
Georges Seurat 1884, retouched 1887, Une baignade à Asnières (Bathers in Asnières), oil on canvas, 201 x 300 cm, National Gallery, London

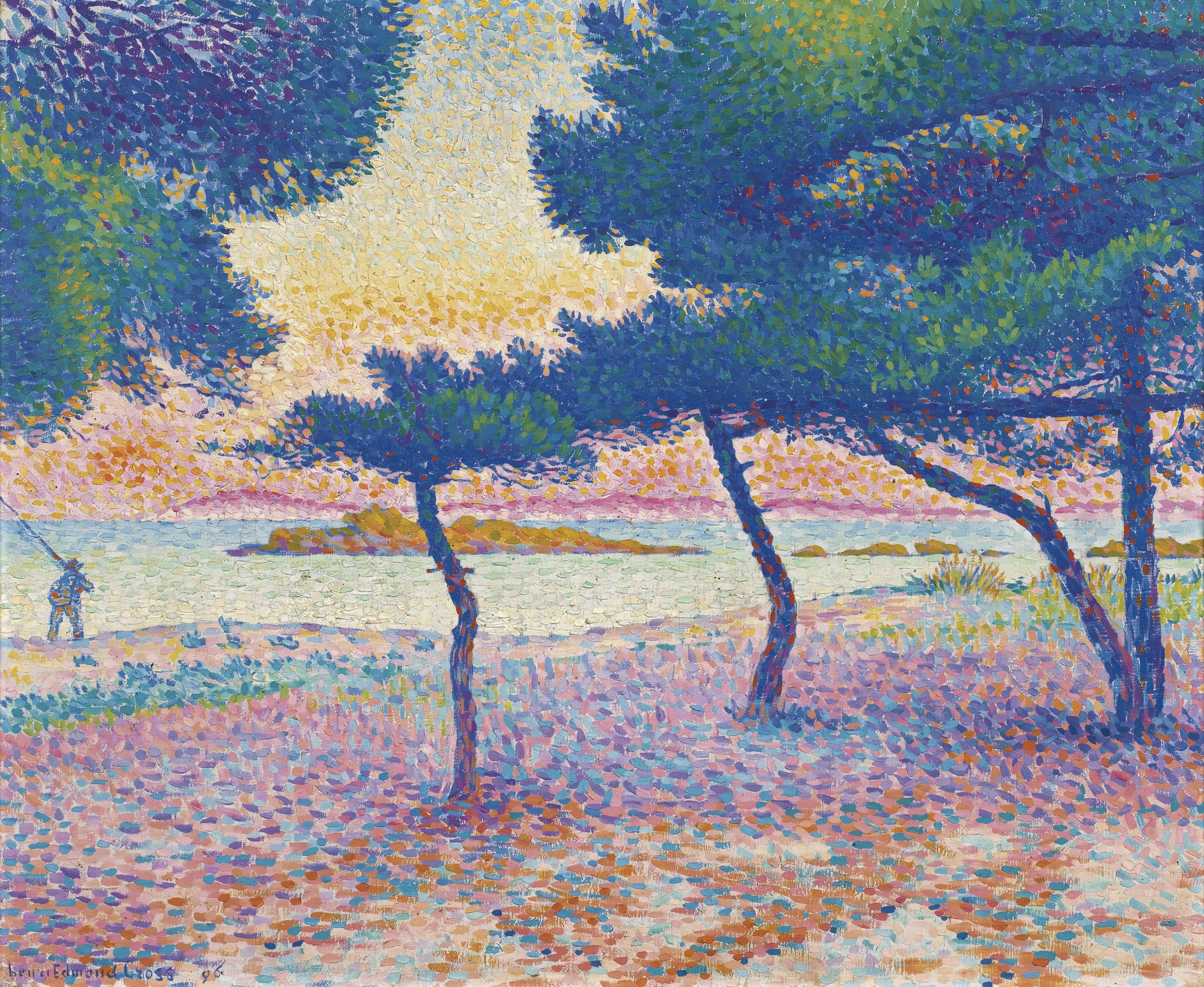
Henri-Edmond Cross, 1896, La Plage de Saint-Clair, oil on canvas, 54.5 by 65.4 cm

The Salon des Indépendants arose through the need by artists to present their works to the general public independently, rather than through the official selective method of the "Salon" (created by Louis XIV). A small collective of innovative artists—Paul Cézanne, Paul Gauguin, Henri de Toulouse-Lautrec, Camille Pissarro along with Albert Dubois-Pillet, Odilon Redon, Georges Seurat, Paul Signac—created the Salon des Indépendants. The right to present their works to the public with no restrictions was their only condition. Article no. 1 of the By-laws of the organization: "The purpose of Société des Artistes Indépendants—based on the principle of abolishing admission jury—is to allow the artists to present their works to public judgement with complete freedom".

On 1 December 1884, Lucien Boué, President of the Paris City Council, opened the first Salon des Artistes Indépendants at the Palais Polychrome (near the Palais de l'Industrie). The Salon became the refuge for artworks deemed unacceptable by the traditional Salon. Among the works exhibited were Seurat's "La baignade à Asnières" Signac's "Le Pont d'Austerlitz", and works of Henri-Edmond Cross, Odilon Redon, Albert Dubois-Pillet, Louis Valtat, Armand Guillaumin, Charles Angrand, Paul Cézanne, Paul Gauguin, Henri de Toulouse-Lautrec, and Vincent van Gogh.

The proceeds of the first show were earmarked for the victims of cholera. The second exhibition was held in 1886 in a temporary building in the Tuileries Garden with 200 paintings exhibited, including the first showing by Henri Rousseau. By 1905 Pierre Bonnard, Jean Metzinger and Henri Matisse had exhibited there. During the period between 1890 and 1914 known as La Belle Époque practically all of the artists associated with modernism and the avant-garde exhibited at the Indépendants. The works exhibited ranged in style from Realist to post-Impressionist, Nabis, Symbolist, Neo-impressionist/Divisionist, Fauve, Expressionist, Cubist and Abstract art.

The submission payment was 10 francs for four works. In 1906 ten works could be submitted for 25 francs and from 1909 only two.

In 1895 and 1897 the Salon des Indépendants was held at the Palais des Beaux-Arts et des Arts libéraux (Champ de Mars). Between 1901 and 1907, the exhibition was held in the Grandes Serres de la Ville de Paris (Cours-la-Reine, Paris), also called Grande Serre de l'Alma, built for the Exposition Universelle of 1900. From 1920 the exhibitions were held at the Grand Palais des Champs-Elysées in Paris. After some initial successes in the 1880s, response to the Indépendants waned in the 1890s. By 1897 art critic Andre Fontainas would complain "The Salon of the Independants reveals itself to be more and more sterile every year. Nothing, nothing and nothing! ... Why M. Signac? Why M. Luce?" Many avant-garde artists, including those associated with the Société des Artistes Indépendants shifted towards commercial venues in the 1890s.

Due to space constraints stemming from preparations for the 1900 Exposition Universelle, the 1899 exhibition had only 187 artists, down from more than 1000 in 1897. In 1900, the Indépendants reached its lowpoint, with only 55 exhibitors and few serious or substantial critical reviews.

== 1901 Turning Point ==
In 1901, however, the society rebounded with more than 1000 paintings exhibited, and critics paying it serious attention again. Reviews of that years show were decidedly positive, even calling it "one of the most brilliant exhibitions" in the group's 17-year history. Fontainas, who had cried "Why M. Signac?" in 1897, and in 1899 declared the society "almost dead" did an abrupt about-face in 1901, highly praising the Salon. Art critic Roger Marx highly praised that year's exhibition and importantly, he continued to link its success to the ideals of freedom on which the society had been founded. "Overall, the exhibition of the Independents is more and better than the protesting Salon des Refusés; it gives the example of an open society where the rights of all are equal, where everyone is answerable only to himself and remains individually responsible. The artist admits and shows himself as he is, openly without pretense; the viewer, meanwhile, receives no watchword from the jury, follows the inclination of his preferences and decides, in his own way, from beginning to end. Fortunate training for the will, is it not true, that which accustoms man to use his independence to act, to think by himself and for himself, consulting no-one, in the blissfulness of free will!"

In the following years the exhibition continued to grow in both numbers and importance. 2,395 works were exhibited in 1904, and in 1905, the Salon showed 4,269 works by 669 artists. By 1908 six thousand works were displayed at the Indépendants. In 1910 the number of artists increased to 1,182, rising progressively to 2,175 by 1930. But the Société's inclusive principles meant it would always be subject to the criticism that it valued quantity over quality: in 1926 the critic Louis Vauxcelles estimated that only 100 of the 3,726 artworks were of any value.

== 1902-1904: Towards a New Classical Canon ==
1902-04 continued the success seen in the 1901 Salon. Critics increasingly praised the harmony and beauty of Neo-Impressionist paintings of the Mediterranean coast. The art critic Fagus wrote in La Revue Blanche that Henri-Edmond Cross's works that year showed "the quivering of these Provencal pines, the beautiful rise towards the arabesque, towards the beautiful line, towards a new classical canon!". This year also featured a retrospective of works by Toulouse-Lautrec.

For the first time, the establishment journal Gazette des Beaux-Arts reviewed the annual Salon in 1903, marking the coming of age of the Indépendants. In 1903, Jean Metzinger sent three paintings to the Salon des Indépendants, and subsequently moved to Paris with the proceeds from their sale. He again exhibiting several paintings, this time along with Robert Delaunay, at the Indépendants of 1904, where Cross presented his Venice series. In 1905 the salon featured retrospectives of works by Seurat and Vincent van Gogh. Throughout this time, the Société des Artistes Indépendants was strongly associated with the Neo-Impressionists.

== 1905 Fauvism ==
From 24 March to 30 April, the burgeoning of Fauvism was visible at the Indépendants, prior to the infamous Salon d'Automne exhibition of 1905 which historically marks the birth of the term Fauvism, after critic Louis Vauxcelles described their show of work with the phrase "Donatello chez les fauves" ("Donatello among the wild beasts"), contrasting the paintings with a Renaissance-style sculpture that shared the room with them.

At the 1905 Indépendants Henri Matisse exhibited with Albert Marquet, Jean Puy, Henri Manguin, Othon Friesz, Raoul Dufy, Kees van Dongen, André Derain, Maurice de Vlaminck, Charles Camoin and Jean Metzinger. This exhibition was reviewed by Vauxcelles in Gil Blas on 4, 18 and 23 March 1905.

Matisse exhibited the proto-Fauve painting Luxe, Calme et Volupté. In the Divisionist technique and brightly colored, it was painted in 1904, after a summer spent working in St. Tropez on the French Riviera alongside the neo-Impressionist painters Paul Signac and Henri-Edmond Cross. The painting is Matisse's most important work in which he used the Divisionist technique advocated by Signac, which Matisse had first adopted after reading Signac's essay, "D'Eugène Delacroix au Néo-impressionisme" in 1898. Signac purchased the work after the 1905 Salon des Indépendants.

Matisse is in charge of the hanging committee, assisted by Metzinger, Bonnard, Camoin, Laprade Luce, Manguin, Marquet, Puy and Vallotton.

== 1906, all the Fauves ==
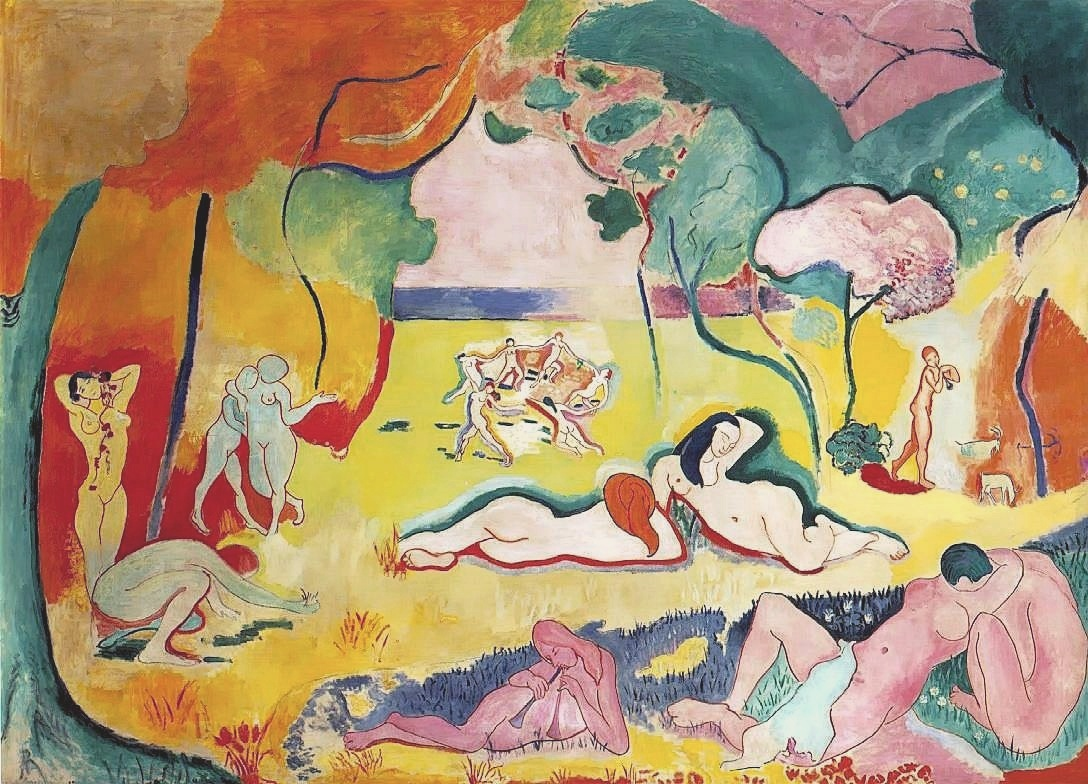
Henri Matisse, 1905–06, Le bonheur de vivre, oil on canvas, 175 cm × 241 cm (69 in × 95 in), Barnes Foundation, Philadelphia, Pennsylvania

At the Salon des Indépendants of 1906 the elected members of the hanging committee included Matisse, Signac and Metzinger. Following the Salon d'Automne of 1905 which marked the beginning of Fauvism, the Salon des Indépendants of 1906 marked the first time all the Fauves would exhibit together. The centerpiece of the exhibition was Matisse's monumental Le Bonheur de Vivre (The Joy of Life). The triangular composition is closely related to Cézanne's Bathers; a series that would soon become a source of inspiration for Picasso's Les Demoiselles d'Avignon. Critics were horrified by the flatness, bright colors, eclectic style and mixed technique of Le Bonheur de Vivre.

According to Metzinger's memoirs, it was at the 1906 Salon des Indépendants that he met Albert Gleizes and visited his studio in Courbevoie several days later. In 1907, at Max Jacob's place, Metzinger met Guillaume Krotowsky, who already signed his works Guillaume Apollinaire.

In 1906 Metzinger had acquired enough prestige to be elected to the hanging committee of the Salon des Indépendants, in addition to his entry of eight works. He formed a close friendship at this time with Robert Delaunay, with whom he would share an exhibition at Berthe Weill's gallery early in 1907. The two of them were singled out by one critic (Louis Vauxcelles) in 1907 as Divisionists who used large, mosaic-like 'cubes' to construct small but highly symbolic compositions.

== 1907, the wholesale transformation ==
In the spring of 1906 Georges Braque exhibited his works for the first time at the Salon des Indépendants. At the exhibition of 1907, held from 20 March to 30 April, six paintings by Braque were exhibited. Five were purchased directly at the Salon des Indépendants by the art dealer Wilhelm Uhde for a total price of 505 FF. The sixth work was presumably bought by the art dealer Kahnweiler. It was around this time that Braque first met Kahnweiler and was introduced to Picasso by Guillaume Apollinaire. Braque's works were still Fauve in nature. It wasn't until the autumn of 1907 at L’Estaque that Braque began his transition away from bright hues to more subdued colors, possibly as a result of the memorial exhibition of Cézanne's work at the Salon d'Automne of 1907. André Derain exhibited his Dancer at Le Rat Mort, painted during the winter of 1906, and his large Bathers (Museum of Modern Art, New York) of early 1907. No longer truly Fauve, this work is close to Cézanne in its angular form and tonal modeling.

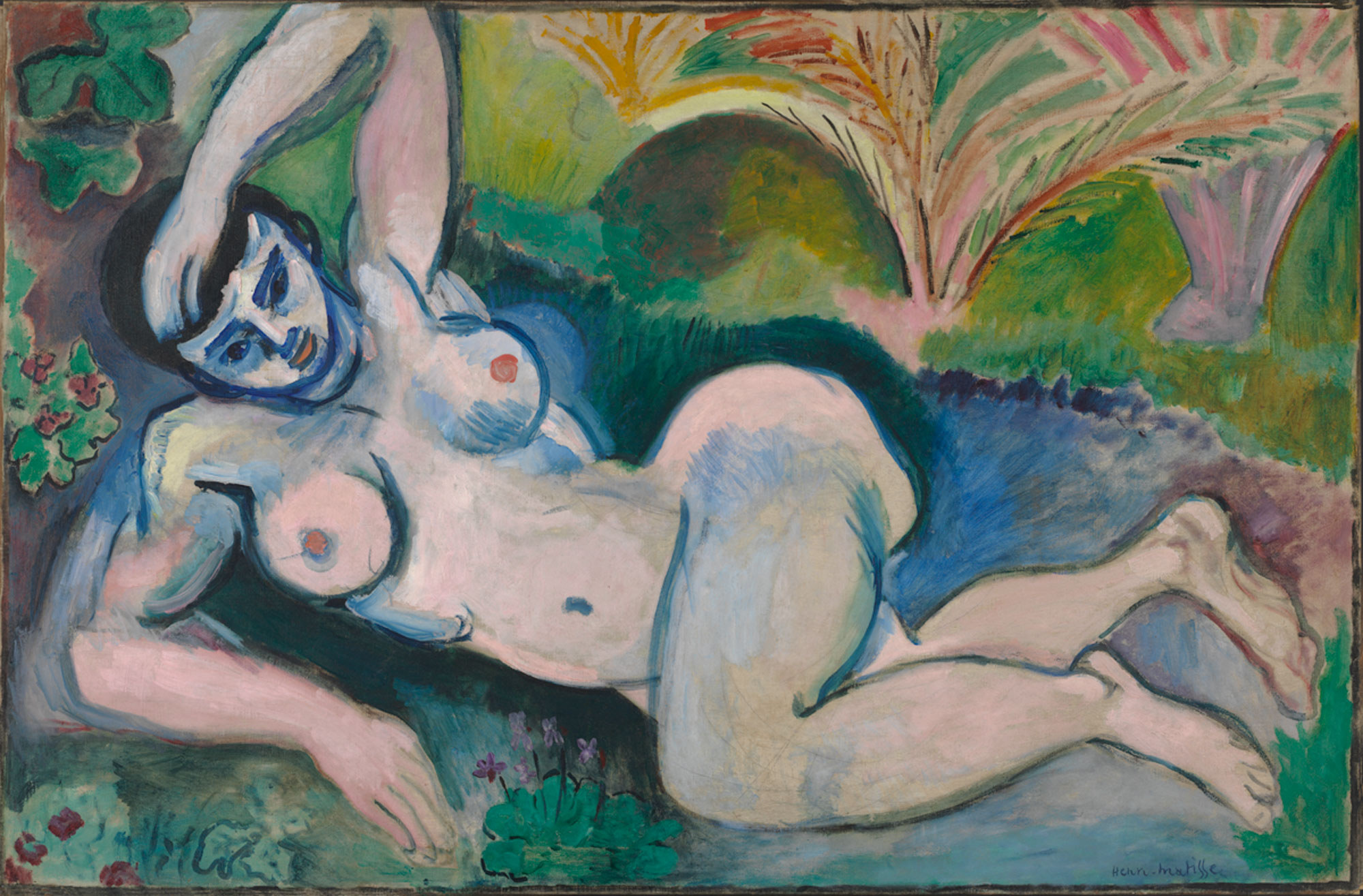
Henri Matisse, 1907, Blue Nude (Souvenir de Biskra), oil on canvas. 92 x 140 cm, Baltimore Museum of Art

Matisse's Blue Nude (Souvenir de Biskra) also appeared at the 1907 Indépendants, entitled Tableau no. III. Vauxcelles writes on the topic of Nu bleu:

I admit to not understanding. An ugly nude woman is stretched out upon grass of an opaque blue under the palm trees... This is an artistic effect tending toward the abstract that escapes me completely. (Vauxcelles, Gil Blas, 20 March 1907)

Blue Nude would later create a sensation at the Armory Show of 1913 in New York City. The painting, already a certain distance from Fauvism, was deemed so ugly students burned it in effigy at the 1913 Armory Show in Chicago, where it had toured from New York.

In addition to the works of Matisse, Derain and Braque, the Indépendants of 1907 included six works (each) by Vlaminck, Dufy, Metzinger, Delaunay, Camoin, Herbin, Puy, and Valtat, and three by Marquet.

Vauxcelles described this group of 'Fauves':

A movement I consider dangerous (despite the great sympathy I have for its perpetrators) is taking shape among a small clan of youngsters. A chapel has been established, two haughty priests officiating. MM Derain and Matisse; a few dozen innocent catechumens have received their baptism. Their dogma amounts to a wavering schematicism that proscribes modeling and volumes in the name of I-don't-know-what pictorial abstraction. This new religion hardly appeals to me. I don't believe in this Renaissance... M. Matisse, fauve-in-chief; M. Derain, fauve deputy; MM. Othon Friesz and Dufy, fauves in attendance... and M. Delaunay (a fourteen-year-old-pupil of M. Metzinger...), infantile fauvelet. (Vauxcelles, Gil Blas, 20 March 1907)

Jean Metzinger, 1907, Paysage coloré aux oiseaux aquatiques, oil on canvas, 74 x 99 cm, Musée d’Art Moderne de la Ville de Paris

The Fauvism of Matisse and Derain was virtually over by the spring of the 1907 Indépendants. And by the Salon d'Automne of 1907 it had ended for many others as well. The shift from bright pure colors loosely applied to the canvas gave way to a more calculated geometric approach. The priority of simplified form began to overtake the representational aspect of the works. The simplification of representational form gave way to a new complexity; the subject matter of the paintings progressively became dominated by a network of interconnected geometric planes, the distinction between foreground and background no longer sharply delineated, and the depth of field limited.

Many of Cézanne's paintings had been exhibited at the Salon d'Automne of 1904, 1905 and 1906. After Cézanne died in 1906, his paintings were exhibited in Paris in the form of a retrospective at the Salon d'Automne of 1907, greatly attracting interest and affecting the direction taken by the avant-garde artists in Paris prior to the advent of Cubism. Cézanne's explorations of geometric simplification and optical phenomena inspired not just Matisse, Derain, Braque and Metzinger, but the other artists who exhibited earlier with the Fauves. Those who had not transited through a Fauve stage, such as Picasso, experimented, too, with the complex fracturing of form. Cézanne had thus sparked a wholesale transformation in the area of artistic investigation that would profoundly affect the development modern art of the 20th century.

== 1908, barbarous schematizers ==
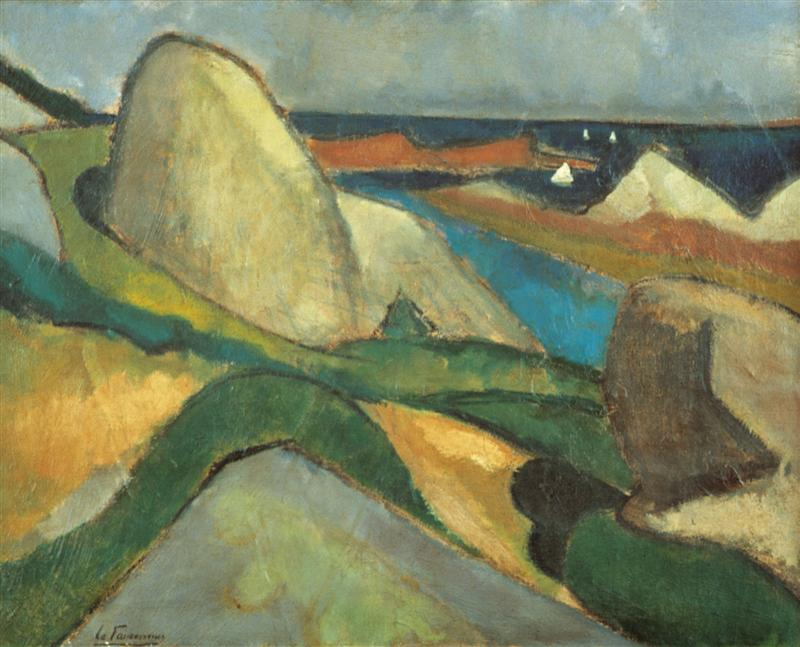
Henri le Fauconnier, 1908, Ploumanac'h, Museum Kranenburgh, Bergen, Holland

Jean Metzinger, c.1908, Baigneuses (Bathers). Dimensions and location unknown. Illustrated in Gelett Burgess, The Wild Men of Paris, The Architectural Record, Document 3, May 1910, New York

Signac becomes president of the 24th Salon des Indépendants. At the exhibition of 1908, held 20 March through 2 May, a painting by Braque strikes Apollinaire by its originality. Though not listed in the catalog, it was described in L'Intransigeant. In his review published in La Revue des lettres et des arts (1 May 1908) Apollinaire claims that Braque's work is the most original effort presented at the salon. Even in the absence of Matisse and Picasso, Vauxcelles, in Gil Blas (20 March 1908) refers to the most innovative artists of the exposition as 'barbarous schematizers'... who want to create an 'abstract art'.

This exhibition was reviewed in the New York Herald 20 March 1908; by Vauxcelles in Gil Blas 20 March 1908; by C. Le Senne in Le Courrier du Soir, 22 March 1908; and by Maurice Denis, in La Grande revue, 10 April 1908.

In excess of 1,314 artists exhibit 6,701 works. Matisse does not submit any works.

After this salon, the writer Gelett Burgess begins a series of interviews with the avant-garde working currently in Paris and surrounding banlieues. These interviews and Burgess' impressions of the works produced are published in Architectural Record, May 1910, at the heart of the proto-Cubist period.

Gelett Burgess writes in The Wild Men of Paris:

"Though the school was new to me, it was already an old story in Paris. It had been a nine-days’ wonder. Violent discussions had raged over it; it had taken its place as a revolt and held it, despite the fulmination of critics and the contempt of academicians. The school was increasing in numbers, in importance. By many it was taken seriously. At first, the beginners had been called "The Invertebrates." In the Salon of 1905 they were named "The Incoherents." But by 1906, when they grew more perfervid, more audacious, more crazed with theories, they received their present appellation of "Les Fauves"—the Wild Beasts. And so, and so, a-hunting I would go!"

"It was Matisse who took the first step into the undiscovered land of the ugly. Matisse himself, serious, plaintive, a conscientious experimenter, whose works are but studies in expression, who is concerned at present with but the working out of the theory of simplicity, denies all responsibility for the excesses of his unwelcome disciples."

"Picasso, keen as a whip, spirited as a devil, mad as a hatter, runs to his studio and contrives a huge nude woman composed entirely of triangles, and presents it in triumph. What wonder Matisse shakes his head and does not smile! He chats thoughtfully of the "Harmony and volume" and "architectural values," and wild Braque climbs to his attic and builds an architectural monster which he names Woman, with balanced masses and parts, with openings and columnar legs and cornices. Matisse praises the direct appeal to instinct of the African wood images, and even a sober Dérain, a co-experimenter, loses his head, moulds a neolithic man into a solid cube, creates a woman of spheres, stretches a cat out into a cylinder, and paints it red and yellow!"

"Metzinger once did gorgeous mosaics of pure pigment, each little square of color not quite touching the next, so that an effect of vibrant light should result. He painted exquisite compositions of cloud and cliff and sea; he painted women and made them fair, even as the women upon the boulevards fair. But now, translated into the idiom of subjective beauty, into this strange Neo-Classic language, those same women, redrawn, appear in stiff, crude, nervous lines in patches of fierce color."

== 1909, simplified forms ==
According to John Golding's influential history of Cubism published in 1959, it was at the Salon des Indépendants of 1909, held 25 March through 2 May, that one of the first Cubist painting was exhibited to the public: Little Harbor in Normandy (Petit port en Normandie), no. 215, entitled Paysage, by Georges Braque (Art Institute of Chicago). On 25 March 1909, Louis Vauxcelles qualifies the works of Braque (Bracke, sic) exhibited at the Salon des Indépendants as "bizarreries cubiques" (cubic oddities). In Room 16 hung works by Derain, Dufy, Friesz, Laprade, Matisse, Jean Puy, Rouault and Vlaminck.

The evolution towards a more linear style with simplified forms continues with greater emphasis on clear geometric principles (derived from Cézanne) not solely visible in the works of Braque, but too in the works of Metzinger, Gleizes, Le Fauconnier and Delaunay (Picasso being absent from the salons).

== 1910, ignorant geometers ==
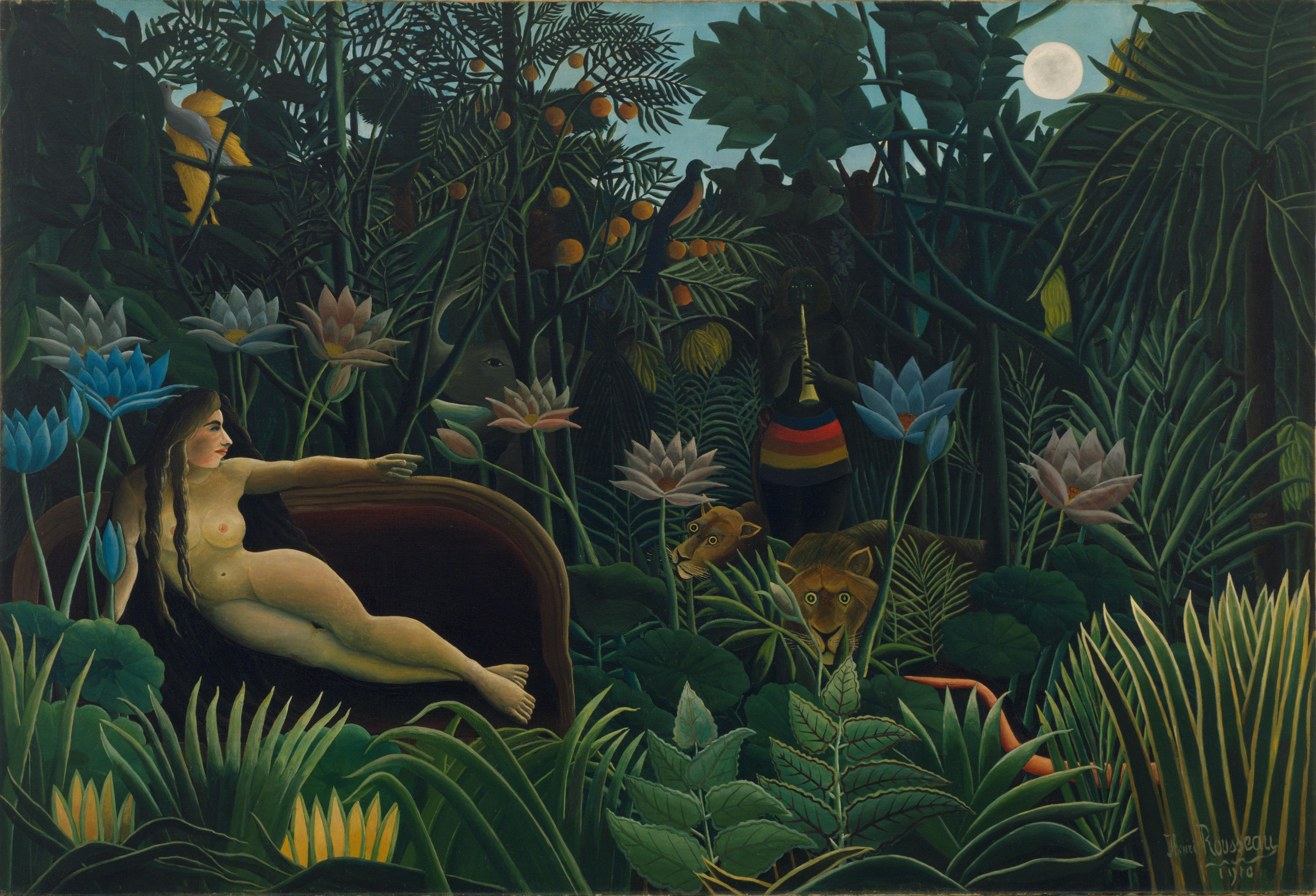
Henri Rousseau (Le Douanier), 1910, The Dream, MoMA. Exhibited at the 1910 Indépendants a few months before his death

Gleizes exhibits in the Salon des Indépendants for the first time: Portrait de René Arcos and L'Arbre, two paintings in which the emphasis on simplified geometric form overwhelms to a large extent the representational interest of the painting. The same tendency is evident in Metzinger's Portrait of Apollinaire exhibited in the same salon. According to Apollinaire this was the 'first Cubist portrait'. Apollinaire himself has pointed out in his book The Cubist Painters (1913), that Metzinger, following Picasso and Braque, was chronologically the third Cubist artist. According to Gleizes's memoirs, Alexandre Mercereau introduces him to Metzinger, but only after the Salon d'Automne do they become seriously interested in each other's work.

Louis Vauxcelles, in his review of the 26th Salon des Indépendants (1910), made a passing and imprecise reference to Metzinger, Gleizes, Delaunay, Léger and Le Fauconnier, as "ignorant geometers, reducing the human body, the site, to pallid cubes."

The work of Metzinger, Le Fauconnier and Robert Delaunay were exhibited together. Le Fauconnier showed the geometrically simplified Ploumanac'h landscapes: Le Ravin and Village dans les Montagne, along with Femme à l'éventail and Portrait of Maroussia. In the same hall hung the works of Matisse, Vlaminck, Dufy, Laurencin, van Dongen and Henri Rousseau.

Apollinaire wrote in the daily newspaper L'Intransigeant, which had a circulation of about 50,000, about the exhibition that consisted of close to 6000 paintings.

=== 1910, Lolo the donkey ===
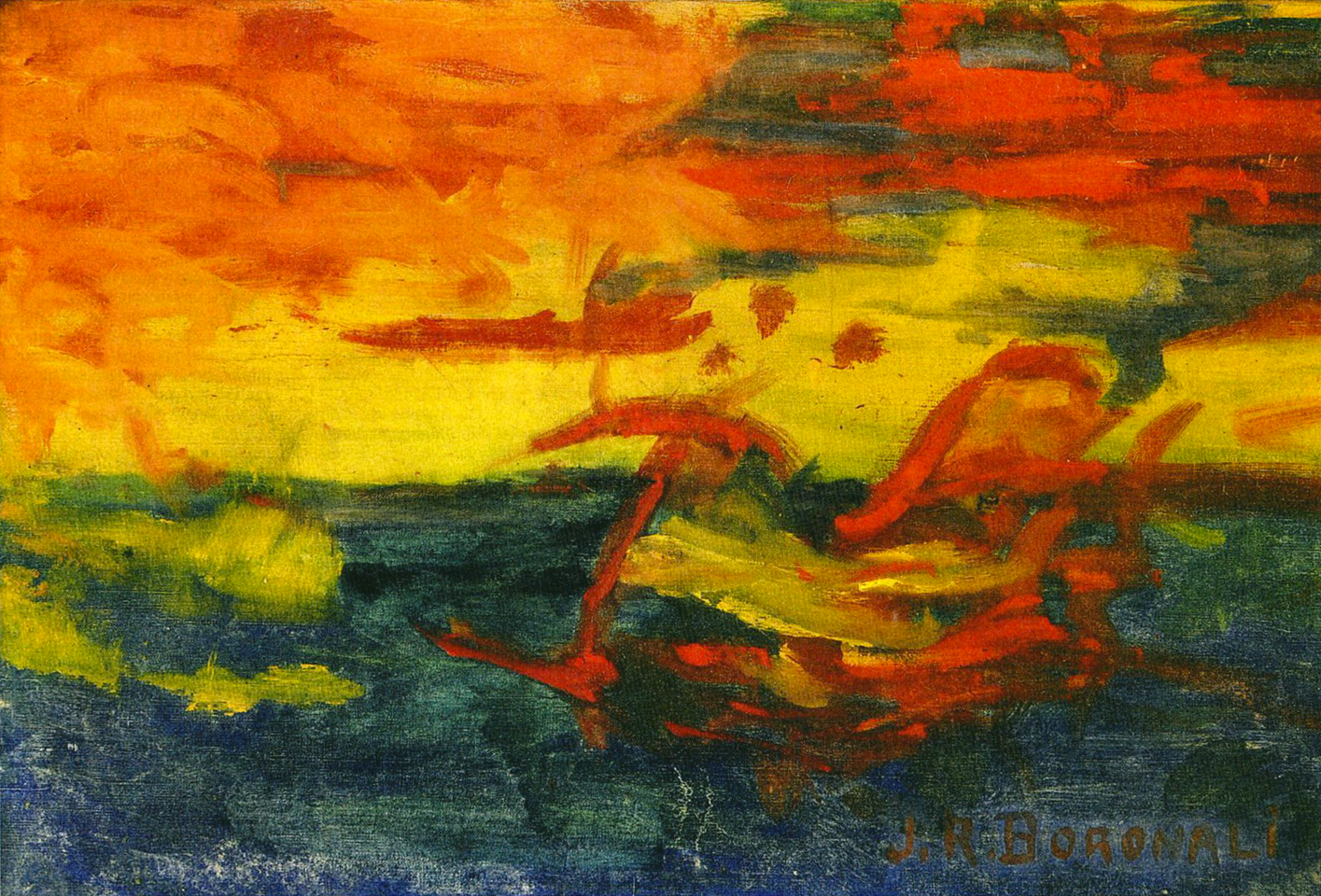
Joachim-Raphaël Boronali, 1910, Et le soleil s'endormit sur l'Adriatique, oil on canvas, 54 x 80 cm, painted by the donkey Lolo. Exhibited at the Salon des Indépendants, 1910

Remarkably, the presence of a painting made by a donkey named Lolo passed by practically unnoticed. The painting was entitled Et le soleil s'endormit sur l'Adriatique presented by the fictitious artist Joachim-Raphaël Boronali, the 'excessivist' from Genoa was exhibited at the 1910 Salon des Indépendants. Boronali was in fact a Parisian donkey (Lolo), who made the painting with his tail. It is suspected that Lolo belonged to Frédéric Gérard (Le Père Frédé), owner of the cabaret Lapin Agile in Montmartre. Roland Dorgelès and two friends, André Warnod et Jules Depaquit, attached a paint brush to the tail of the animal. The donkey did the rest. The painting sold for 400FF (equal to 1,257 Euros today) and was donated by Dorgelès to the Orphelinat des Arts. The painting forms part of the permanent collection at l'Espace culturel Paul Bédu (Milly-la-Forêt).

== 1911, the major scandal of Cubism ==
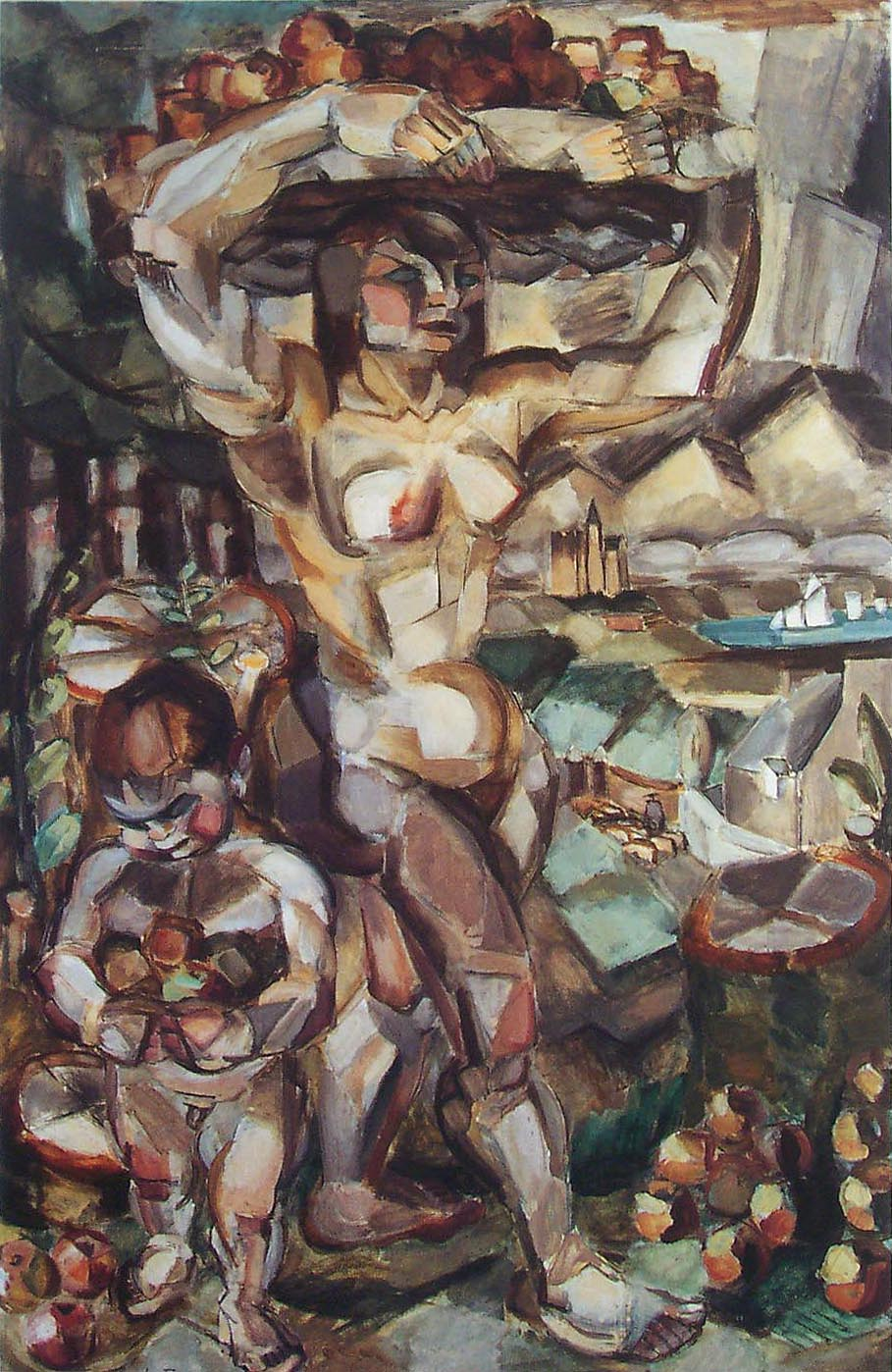
Henri Le Fauconnier, 1910-11, L'Abondance (Abundance), oil on canvas, 191 cm × 123 cm (75 in × 48 in) Gemeentemuseum Den Haag. Exhibited at the 1911 Indépendants

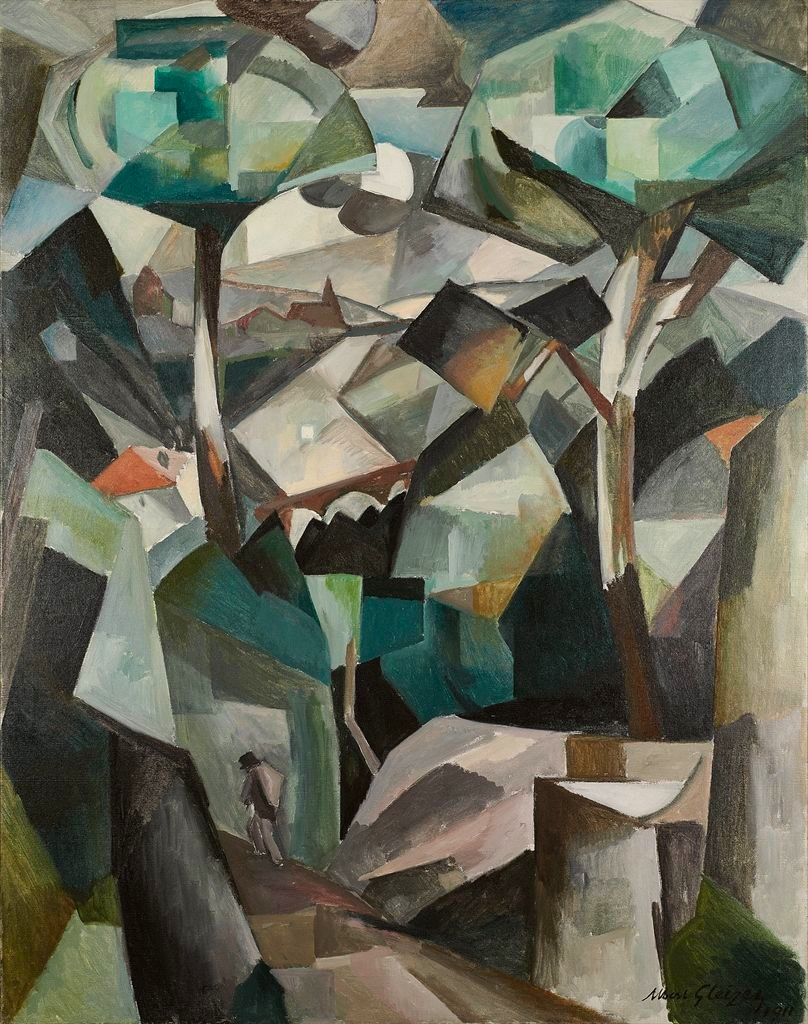
Albert Gleizes, 1911, Le Chemin, Paysage à Meudon (Paysage avec personnage), oil on canvas, 146.4 x 114.4 cm. Exhibited at Salon des Indépendants, 1911. Stolen by Nazi occupiers from the home of collector Alphonse Kann during World War II, returned to its rightful owners in 1997

Jean Metzinger, 1910–11, Deux Nus (Two Nudes, Two Women), oil on canvas, 92 x 66 cm, Gothenburg Museum of Art, Sweden. Exhibited at the first Cubist manifestation, Room 41 of the 1911 Salon des Indépendants, Paris

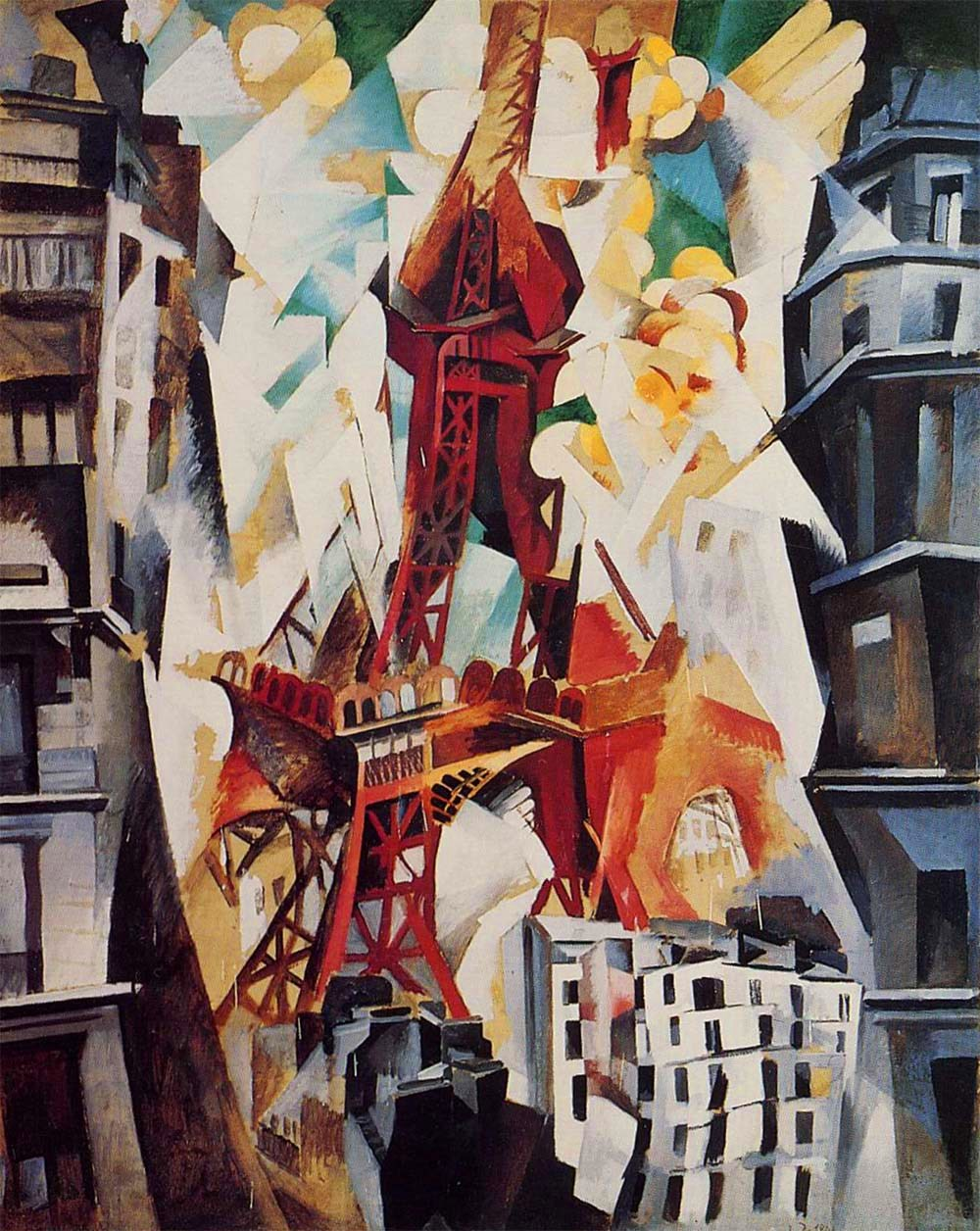
Robert Delaunay, 1911, Champs de Mars. La Tour rouge, Art Institute of Chicago. Exhibited at Salon des Indépendants, 1911

The newly formed Montparnasse group (who held meetings not just at Le Fauconnier's studio, but at the cafés Le Dôme, La Coupole, La Closerie des Lilas, Le Select, and Café de la Rotonde) together with other young painters who also want to emphasise a research into form (as opposed to color) take over the hanging committee of the Salon des Indépendants ensuring that the works of painters now dubbed 'Cubists' would be shown together. Gleizes, Metzinger, Le Fauconnier, Delaunay, Léger and Marie Laurencin (at the request of Apollinaire) are shown together in Room 41.

The result of the group show is a major scandal. Even though the pictures shown are still conventional representations that generally observe the rules of classical perspective (according to Gleizes), the public is outraged by the representation of subject matter as cones, cubes and spheres, resulting in the obscurity of the subject matter. The predominance of sharp geometrical faceting and the fact that a group of artists are all working in similar directions, gives rise to the term 'Cubism'. Although this and similar terms have been used before in artistic circles (usually in relation to the works of Metzinger, Delaunay and Braque), this is the first time the use of the term becomes widespread.

The term 'Cubism' is employed in June 1911 by Apollinaire, speaking in the context of 'Les Indépendants', Musée Moderne de Bruxelles in Brussels, which includes works by Gleizes, Delaunay, Léger, and Le Fauconnier. During the summer, Gleizes is in close contact with Metzinger, who has recently moved to Meudon. Both are discontent with the conventional perspective mechanism. They have long conversations about the nature of form and perception. They agree that traditional painting gives a static and incomplete idea of the subject as experienced in life. Things, they conclude, are in fact dynamic, observed to move, are seen from different angles and can be captured at successive moments in time.

Another Cubist scandal is produced several months later at the Salon d'Automne, where the Indépendants exhibitors develop relations with the Duchamp brothers, Jacques Villon, Raymond Duchamp-Villon and Marcel Duchamp. The studios of Jacques Villon and Raymond Duchamp-Villon at 7, rue Lemaître, become, together with Gleizes' studio at Courbevoie, regular meeting places for the newly formed Groupe de Puteaux (soon to exhibit under the name Section d'Or). František Kupka, the Czech painter interested in non-representational painting based on analogies with music and the progressive abstraction of a subject in motion, joins the discussions.

In the spring of 1911 the cubists made sure they were shown together, infiltrating the placement committee. That Le Fauconnier was the secretary of the salon facilitated the goal of hanging their works together. Until then, works in alphabetical order of the artists names. In room 41 hung works by Metzinger, Gleizes, Léger, Delaunay, Le Fauconnier and Archipenko. In room 43 hung works by André Lhote, Roger de La Fresnaye, André Dunoyer de Segonzac, Luc-Albert Moreau and André Mare.

This exhibition involved more than 6,400 paintings. In room 42 was a retrospective exhibition of Henri (Le Douanier) Rousseau, who died 2 September 1910. Articles and reviews were numerous and extensive in sheer words employed; including in Gil Blas, Comoedia, Excelsior, Action, L'Oeuvre, and Cri de Paris. Apollinaire wrote a long review in the 20 April 1911 issue of L'Intransigeant.

Henri Le Fauconnier's Abundance, 1910-11 (Haags Gemeentemuseum, Den Haag), partly due to its large size and partly to the treatment of its subject matter, was an eye-catcher, causing a sensation. This painting was soon bought by the Dutchman art critic and painter Conrad Kickert (1882–1965), who was secretary of the Contemporary Art Society (Moderne Kunstkring). In 1934 he donated the painting to the Gemeentemuseum, Den Haag.

== 1912, the scandal continues ==
Jean Metzinger, 1911–1912, La Femme au Cheval (Woman with a horse), oil on canvas, 162 x 130 cm, Statens Museum for Kunst, Denmark. Provenance: Jacques Nayral, Niels Bohr. Exhibited at the 1912 Salon des Indépendants.

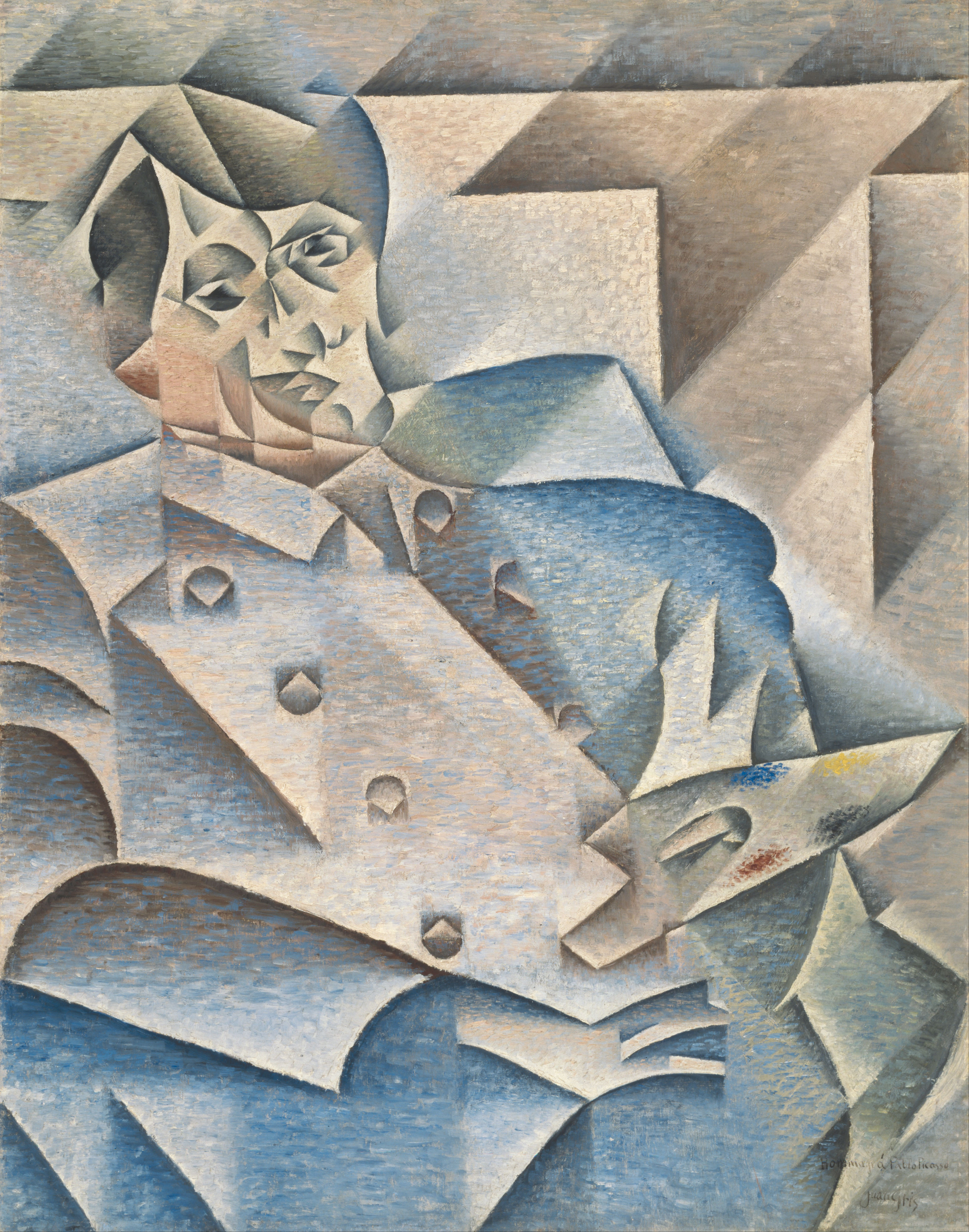
Juan Gris, 1912, Portrait of Picasso, oil on canvas, the Art Institute of Chicago. Exhibited at the 1912 Salon des Indépendants.

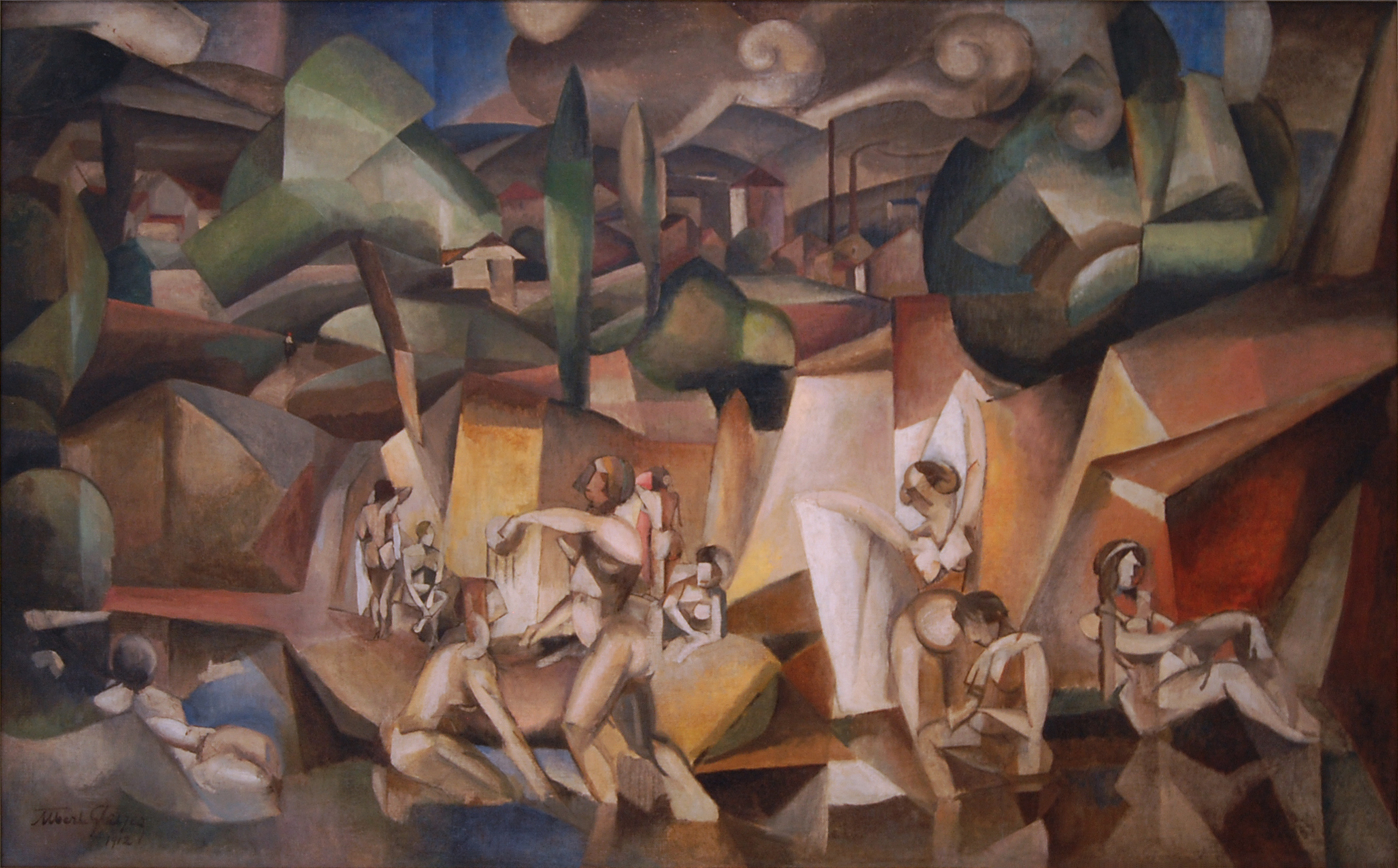
Albert Gleizes, 1912, Les Baigneuses (The Bathers), oil on canvas, 105 x 171 cm, Musée d'Art Moderne de la Ville de Paris. Exhibited at the 1912 Salon des Indépendants.

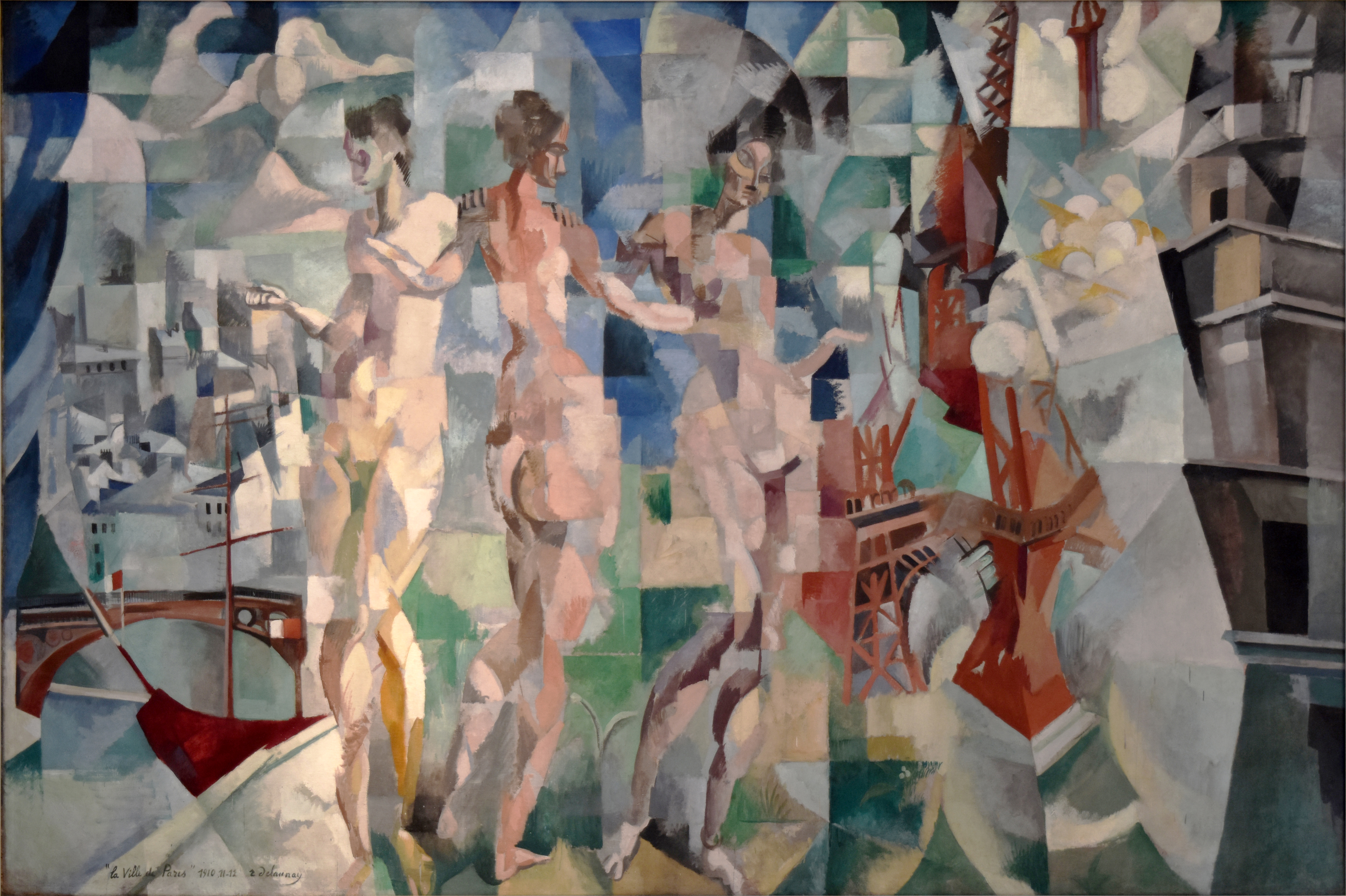
Robert Delaunay, 1912, La Ville de Paris, oil on canvas, Musée d'Art Moderne de la Ville de Paris. Exhibited at the 1912 Salon des Indépendants.

The Salon des Indépendants transpired in Paris from 20 March to 16 May 1912. This massive exhibition occurred exactly one year after Metzinger, Gleizes, Le Fauconnier, Delaunay, Léger and Laurencin were shown together in Room 41 of the 1911 Salon des Indépendants, which provoked the scandal out of which Cubism emerged and spread throughout Paris. Its wide-ranging repercussions were felt in Germany, Holland, Italy, Russia, Spain and elsewhere (influencing Futurism, Suprematism, Constructivism, De Stijl and so on). Just five months prior to this show another polemic developed at the Salon d'Automne of 1912. Originating in Salle XI where the Cubists exhibited their works, this quarrel involved both the French and non-French avant-garde artists. On 3 December 1912 the polemic reached the Chambre des députés and was debated at the Assemblée Nationale. At stake was more than just the future of public funding for exhibitions that included Cubist art. Le Fauconnier, Gleizes, Léger, Metzinger and Archipenko formed the core of the hanging committee at the 1912 Indépendants. The common hall, room 20, in which the Cubists placed themselves became the nucleus of the exhibition.

At the 1912 Salon des Indépendants Albert Gleizes exhibited Les Baigneuses (The Bathers) (no. 1347) — Marcel Duchamp's Nude Descending a Staircase, No. 2 was listed in the catalogue (n. 1001) but was withdrawn prior to the exhibition — Roger de La Fresnaye exhibited Artillerie (no. 1235) — Robert Delaunay showed his monumental Ville de Paris (no. 868) — Jean Metzinger exhibited La Femme au Cheval (Woman with a horse) and Le Port — Fernand Léger showed La Noce — Henri Le Fauconnier, Le Chasseur (The Huntsman) — and the newcomer Juan Gris exhibited his Portrait of Picasso.

The art critic Olivier-Hourcade writes of this exhibition in 1912 and its relation to the creation of a new French school: "Metzinger with his Port, Delaunay with Paris, Gleizes with his Baigneuses, are close to this real and magnificent result, this victory comes from several centuries: the creation of a school of painting, 'French' and absolutely independent."

Roger Allard's reviewed the 1912 Salon des Indépendants in the March–April 1912 issue of La Revue de France et des Pays, noting Metzinger's 'refined choice of colors' and the 'precious rarity' of the painting's 'matière'. André Salmon too, in his review, noted Metzinger's 'refined use of color' in La Femme au Cheval and praised its 'French grace', while noting Metzinger 'illuminated a cubist figure with the virtues of a smile'.

Gleizes, on the other hand, would write in 1913 of the Cubist movements continual evolution:

The changes it had already undergone since the Indépendants of 1911 could leave people in no doubt as to its nature. Cubism was not a school, distinguished by some superficial variation on a generally accepted norm. It was a total regeneration, indicating the emergence of a wholly new cast of mind. Every season it appeared renewed, growing like a living body. Its enemies could, eventually, have forgiven it if only it had passed away, like a fashion; but they became even more violent when they realised that it was destined to live a life that would be longer than that of those painters who had been the first to assume the responsibility for it.

And regarding the reception received by the Cubists at the Salon des Indépendants and Salon d'Automne Gleizes writes:

Never had a crowd been seen thrown into such a turmoil by works of the spirit, and especially over esemplastic works, paintings, whose nature it is to be silent", writes Albert Gleizes, "Never had the critics been so violent as they were at that time. From which it became clear that these paintings—and I specify the names of the painters who were, alone, the reluctant causes of all this frenzy: Jean Metzinger, Henri Le Fauconnier, Fernand Léger, Robert Delaunay and myself—appeared as a threat to an order that everyone thought had been established forever.

== 1913, the peak of Cubism ==
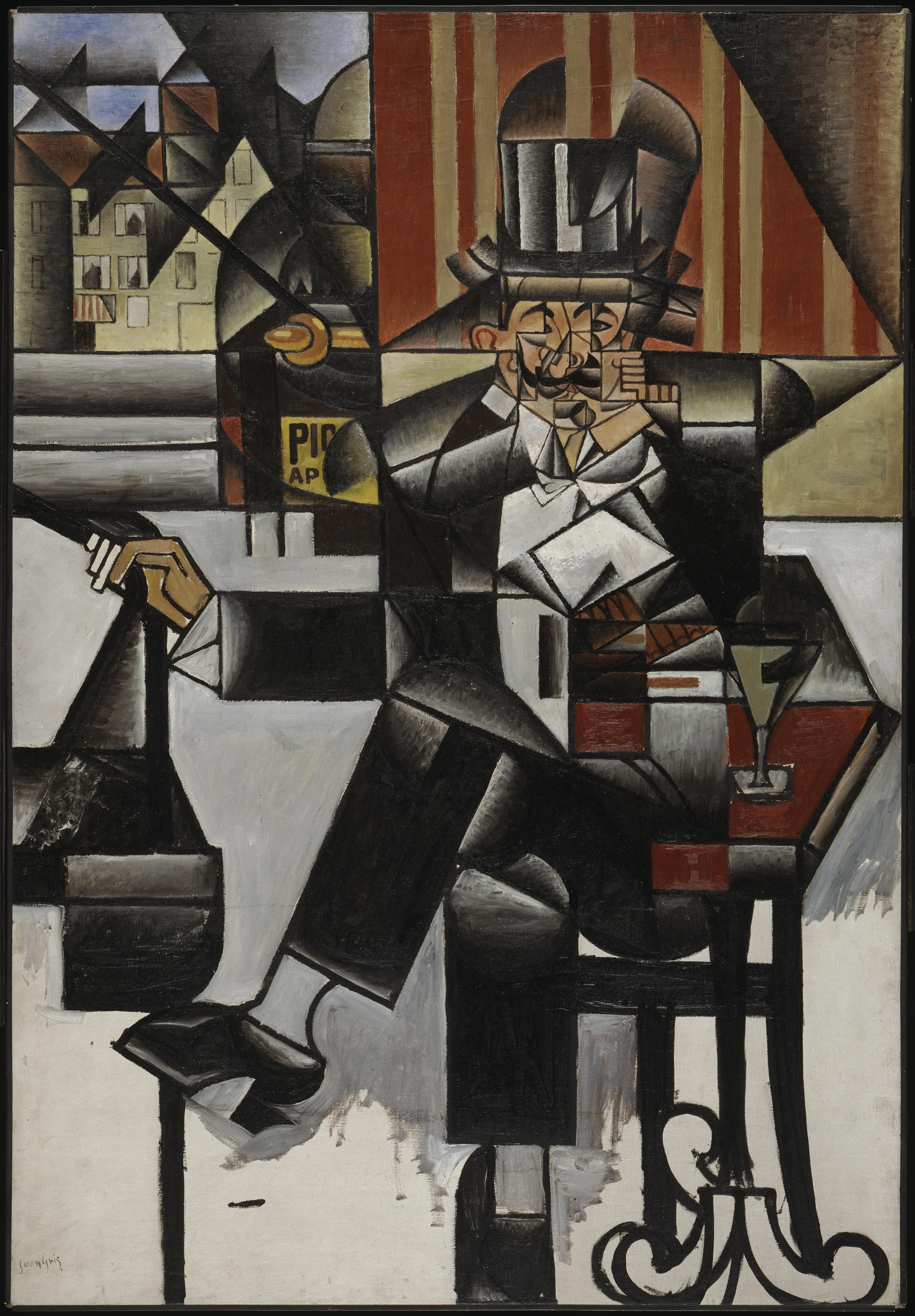
Juan Gris, 1912, Man in a Café, oil on canvas, 127.6 x 88.3 cm, Philadelphia Museum of Art. Exhibited at the 1913 Salon des Indépendants.

The Salon des Indépendants was held March 9 through 18 May, the Cubist works were shown in room 46. Jean Metzinger exhibited his large L'Oiseau bleu — Albert Gleizes, Albert Gleizes. Les Joueurs de football (Football Players) 1912–13, National Gallery of Art, Washington D.C. — Robert Delaunay The Cardiff Team (L'équipe de Cardiff ) 1913, Van Abbemuseum, Eindhoven — Fernand Léger, Le modèle nu dans l'atelier (Nude Model In The Studio) 1912–13, Solomon R. Guggenheim Museum, New York — Juan Gris, L'Homme dans le Café (Man in Café) 1912, Philadelphia Museum of Art.

In room 45 hung the works of Robert Delaunay, Sonia Delaunay, František Kupka, Morgan Russell and Macdonald-Wright. This was the first exhibition where Orphism and Synchromism were emphatically present. Apollinaire in L'Intransigeant mentioned la Salle hollandaise (room 43), which included Jacoba van Heemskerck, Piet Mondrian, Otto van Rees, Jan Sluyters en Leo Gestel and Lodewijk Schelfhout.

== 1914, Orphism ==
The 1914 exhibition, held from 1 March to 30 April, was composed of many Cubist and Orphist works of large dimension and took place in one of the largest rooms on the ground floor: Robert and Sonia Delaunay, Patrick Henry Bruce, Alexander Archipenko, and Jean Metzinger were largely represented.

== 1915-1919 ==
During the First World War there were no exhibitions. After the war, however, there was a revival of Cubism, led by Gleizes and others, which included exhibitions at Léonce Rosenberg's Galerie l'Effort Moderne and a revival of the Salon de la Section d'Or.

== 1920, the emergence of Dada ==
In an attempt to regain their pre-war status at the forefront of the avant-garde, and faced with the possibility of being overthrown by Dada, the cubists regrouped. Their first chance to exhibit together presented itself at the Salon des Indépendants of 1920. But the fight wasn't going to be easy. Opening on 28 January, over three thousand works were display, a large number of which were Cubist paintings. For the first time the exhibition took place at the Grand Palais des Champs-Elysées. Picasso was nowhere to be seen, but others were, such as Archipenko, Braque, Csaky, Gleizes, Gris, Hayden, Herbin, Léger, Lhote, Lipchitz, Metzinger, Severini and Survage.

The most outrageous Dada eruption to date transpired at the Salon des Indépendants of 1920. The Dadaist saw the Indépendants as decisive in the push to the top of the avant-garde food chain of the Parisian art scene. The plan was as cunning as it was devious: Tristan Tzara and André Breton rented an auditorium at the Grand Palais. A group guided by Tzara distributed flyers and posters saying that Charlie Chaplin would appear "in the flesh" on February 5. The crowd heckled when Chaplin (not even aware of the event) never showed up, and Tzara was ready: his group hurled insults back at the crowd from the stage.

The renown literary figure André Gide present in the audience, fooled as the others, described the happening: "Some young people, solemn, stilted, tied up in knots, got up on the platform and as a chorus declaimed insincere inanities".

The offensive event witnessed by the more respectable Cubists solicited a vehement denunciation, declaring Dada an abomination.

== 1921, a new epoch ==
The Salon des Indépendants of 1921, which opened in January, had less Cubist paintings than the previous year. Braque and Metzinger were not represented. The artists that did exhibit included Gleizes, Ferat, Hayden, Marcoussis, Hellesen and Survage. With the Cubists were also Hélène Pordriat, Marthe Laurens, Irène Lagut, Alice Halicka and Sonia Lewitska. At the exhibition were also the works of Bissière, Blanchard, Dufy, Lhote, Tirman, Zadkine and Lipchitz.

The hanging commission was conducted in opposition to Signac, who was in favor of the alphabetical order system. Léger left the placement committee in 1923. In 1924 placement was classified by nationality and alphabetically. Lhote left the placement committee, which consisted of 20 people, along with eight other members in 1925. Lhote was of the opinion that the change was mainly intended for the "Sunday painters". Signac and his supporters defended the alphabetical order stressing 'equal attention to all participants' and that there was no place for 'les petites chapelles' (the little chapels). The latter was especially directed against the neo-cubists, who after the First World wished to be associated with well-known artists.

From 1920 the Société des Artistes Indépendants obtained the Grand Palais for its salon exhibitions. After World War II, the Salon des Indépendants was renewed with the artist group Jeune création, with the assistance of Dunoyer de Segonzac, Bernard Buffet, Jean Carzou, Maurice Boitel, Yves Brayer, Aristide Caillaud, Daniel du Janerand, amongst others.

== Notable exhibitors ==
- Alexander Archipenko
- Jeanne-Marie Barbey
- Josette Bournet
- Georges Braque
- Constantin Brâncuși
- Bernard Buffet
- Charles Camoin
- Marc Chagall
- Georgette Chen
- Giorgio de Chirico
- Luigi Corbellini
- Henri-Edmond Cross
- Joseph Csaky
- Robert Delaunay
- Sonia Delaunay
- Jean Dries
- Albert Dubois-Pillet
- Marcel Duchamp
- Georges Dufrénoy
- Raoul Dufy
- Alexandra Exter
- Henri Le Fauconnier
- Alberto Giacometti
- Albert Gleizes
- Henryk Gotlib
- Juan Gris
- Louise Janin
- Wassily Kandinsky
- František Kupka
- Kiki of Paris
- Roger de La Fresnaye
- Henri Lebasque
- Fernand Léger
- André Lhote
- Maximilien Luce
- Kazimir Malevich
- André Mare
- Albert Marque
- Henri Matisse
- Vadim Meller
- Jean Metzinger
- Joan Miró
- Amedeo Modigliani
- Piet Mondrian
- Edvard Munch
- Henry Ottmann
- Hippolyte Petitjean
- Francis Picabia
- Robert Antoine Pinchon
- Odilon Redon
- Jelka Rosen
- Henri Rousseau
- Olga Sacharoff
- René Schützenberger
- André Dunoyer de Segonzac
- Georges Seurat
- Paul Signac
- Alfred Sisley
- Léopold Survage
- Amadeo de Souza Cardoso
- Sonia Terk
- Henri de Toulouse-Lautrec
- Henriette Tirman
- Vincent van Gogh
- Louis Valtat
- Félix Vallotton
- Jacques Villon
- Édouard Vuillard
- Maurice de Vlaminck
- Othon Friesz

== See also ==
- Académie de La Palette
- French art salons and academies
