= Jeanne-Marie Barbey =

French artist and photographer

- Born: Louise Jeanne Marie Barbée; 17 July 1876; Paris
- Died: 13 August 1960 (aged 84); Bagnolet, Paris.
- Known for: Artist, photographer

Jeanne-Marie Barbey, also known as Louise Jeanne Marie Barbée (17 July 1876 - 13 August 1960) was a French artist, painter and photographer, whose work frequently concentrated on Brittany.

== Early life and education ==
Jeanne-Marie Barbey was born on 17 July 1876 at 51 rue de Charonne in Paris, the fourth and last child of Catherine (née Dupont) (b. 1835) and François Marie Barbée (b. 1832), a cabinetmaker from Carhaix. Her mother was from Gourin, Morbihan, in Brittany where her family worked in millinery. Barbey's three older brothers were Louis (1863-1939), who became a schoolteacher in Paris, François (c.1865-1894) and Auguste (1868-1931), a teacher and later a hotelier in his mother's Breton hometown of Gourin where he ran l'hôtel de la Croix-Verte with his wife, Marie-Louise Le Gal.

Marie-Jeanne Barbey wanted to be a drawing teacher and in 1895 passed the first level of the lycées et collèges diploma, then the second level. In 1896, she was awarded the Diplôme des Ecoles Primaires Supérieures and the Diplôme des Ecoles Normales, and in 1907 the Diplôme des Ecoles de la Ville de Paris. She became an art teacher.

== Brittany ==
A close friend of Anatole Le Braz, a Breton poet and folklorist, she spoke Breton and was interested in Brittany and its traditions. In September 1904, she attended the 7th Congress of the Breton Regionalist Union in Gourin. A devout Catholic, she found a spiritual director in Father Jean Guichard. She became a member of the Fédération régionaliste de Bretagne (Brittany Regionalist Federation).

Every year, she spent her holidays with her brother in Gourin. In 1900, she entered a piece (which she signed "Barbey") in a competition in the village for which the first prize was to be part of the Exposition universelle de Paris. From 1912, she took part in the Salon des Indépendants. Barbey was the first woman to become a member of the committee of the Société des artistes indépendants in 1926, becoming its secretary-rapporteur and treasurer from 1943 to 1960. Her membership of the committee led to a friendship with painter Paul Signac, a co-founder of the society.

She died on 13 August 1960 in Bagnolet, in the eastern suburbs of Paris.

== Works in public collections ==
- Le Faouët, musée du Faouët:
  - Diplôme pour le village breton de l'Exposition universelle de Paris, encre de Chine et aquarelle;
  - Intérieur, 1901, huile sur toile, 60 × 73 cm;
  - La Ribotée.
- Quimper, archives départementales du Finistère: Diplôme, décerné à Mr Le Gall, lithographie (I. J. 993).
- Rennes, musée de Bretagne: fonds photographique de Jeanne-Marie Barbey, composé d'environ 200 négatifs sur plaque de verre, ainsi qu'une lithographie du Dipôme (vierge).
- Vannes, musée de la Cohue:
  - La Course, huile sur toile, don de l'artiste en 1930.
  - Femme à la baratte, 1907, huile sur bois;
  - fonds de 74 œuvres.

== Salons ==
- Salon des artistes français de 1901 à 1914:
  - 1901: Intérieur de ferme à Gourin.
  - 1905: La Ribotée; La Collation.
- Salon des indépendants à partir de 1912.
- Salon des Tuileries en 1924 et 1925.
- Salon de l'Union des femmes peintres et sculpteurs:
  - 1901: Intérieur en Basse-Bretagne; Intérieur d'atelier.
  - 1905: La Servante; La Pipe.

== Exhibitions ==
- 1918: L'Arc en Ciel, at galerie du Luxembourg in Paris with a group of Franco-Anglo-American artists that she co-chaired with Alice Whyte.
- 1919: Peintres d'Amor, galerie Goupil à Paris.
- 2010: Montreuil, exhibition of photographs.
- 1 July - 31 August 2013: Quimperlé, exhibition of photographs.
- 29 June - 13 October 2013: musée du Faouët, Femmes artistes en Bretagne (Le Lavoir, collection particulière).
- 17 June 2017 - 7 January 2018: Pour une redécouverte de Jeanne-Marie Barbey, Vannes, musée de la Cohue.

== Bibliography ==
- Collectif, Jeanne-Marie Barbey, [exhibition catalogue], musée du Faouët, 2005.
- Jean-Marc Michaud, Pour une redécouverte de Jeanne-Marie Barbey, [exhibition catalogue], Vannes, musée de La Cohue, 2017.
- Jean-Marc Michaud, Laurence Prod'homme, David Robot (préf.), Regards Jeanne-Marie Barbey 1876-1960, Vannes, musée de la Cohue, Éditions Locus Solus, 2017, 96 p. (présentation en ligne).
- Laurence Prod'homme & Pauline Jéhannin, Jeanne-Marie Barbey, une peintre photographe en centre-Bretagne, Éditions des Collections photographiques du musée de Bretagne, 2012, 116 p. ISBN 978-2-36510-011-3
- Dictionnaire Bénézit, Ed Gründ, Tome I, p. 729
- Gérald Schurr, Dictionnaire des Petits Maîtres de la peinture, Tome I, Éditions de l'Amateur, p. 80.
- Philippe Le Stum (2018). La Gravure sur Bois en Bretagne, 1850-2000 (in French). Spézet: Coop Breizh. p. 319. ISBN 9782843468216.
