= Hôtel de Ville, Bagnolet =

Town hall in Bagnolet, France

Hôtel de Ville
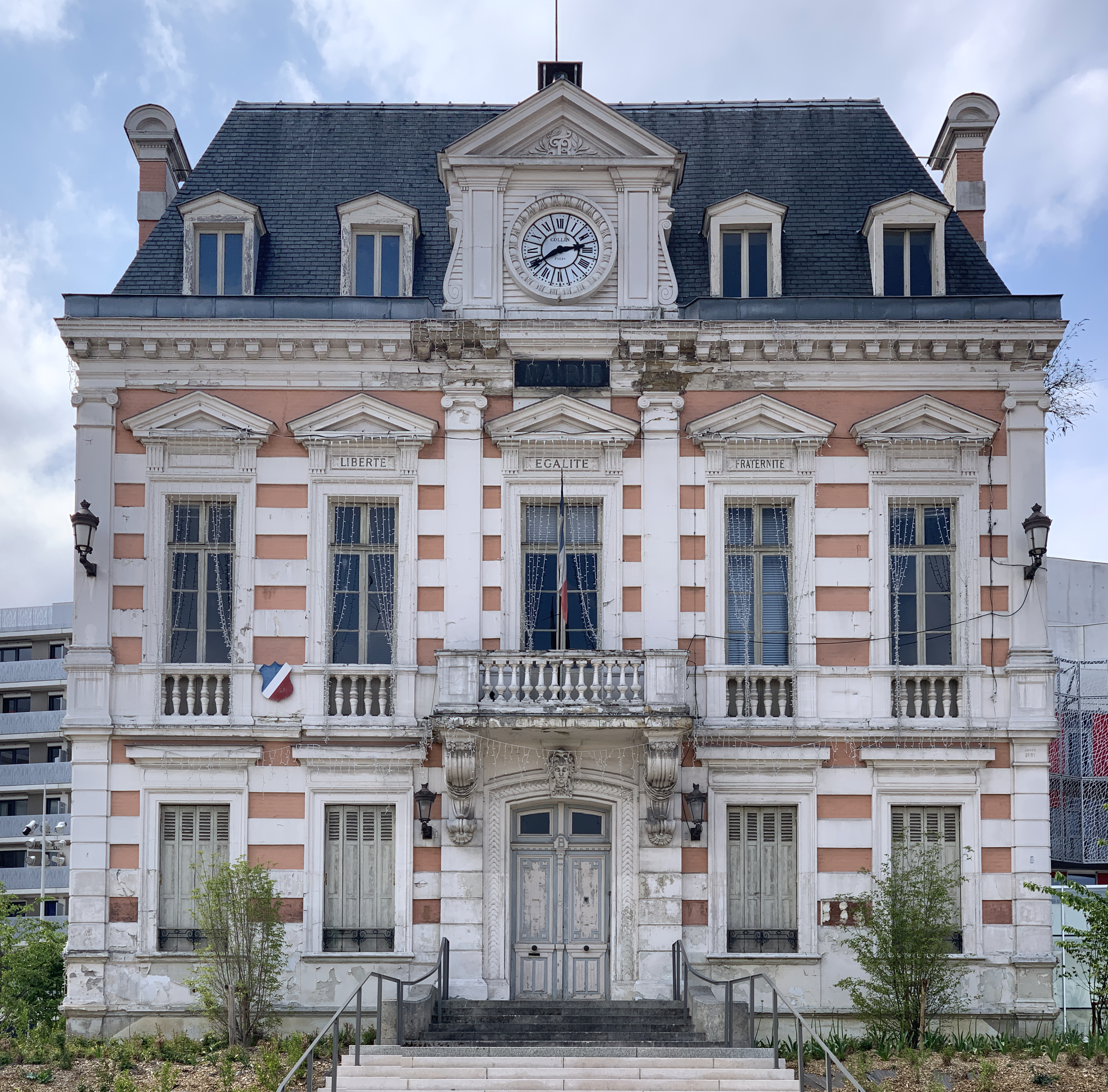
- The main frontage of the Hôtel de Ville in April 2021
- Interactive map of the Hôtel de Ville area

General information
- Type: City hall
- Architectural style: Louis XIII style
- Location: Bagnolet, France
- Coordinates: 48.8687°N 2.4169°E
- Completed: 1881

Design and construction
- Architect: C. Monière

The Hôtel de Ville (French pronunciation: [otɛl də vil], City Hall) is a municipal building in Bagnolet, Seine-Saint-Denis, in the northeast suburbs of Paris, standing on Place Salvador Allende.

== History ==
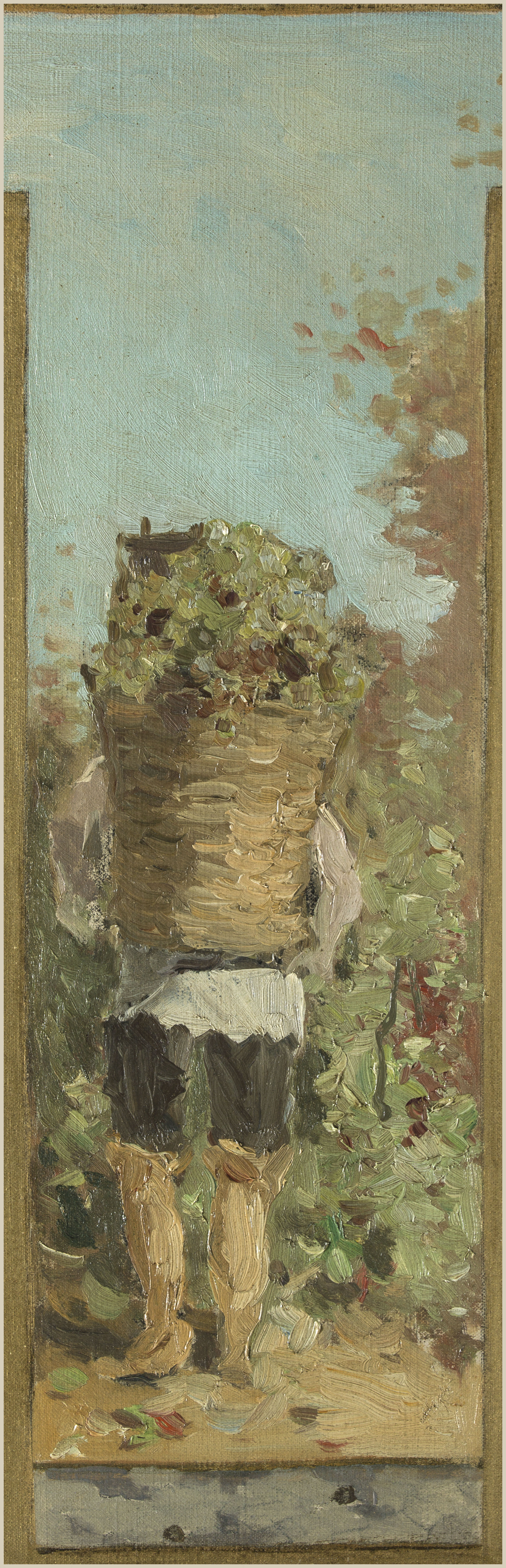
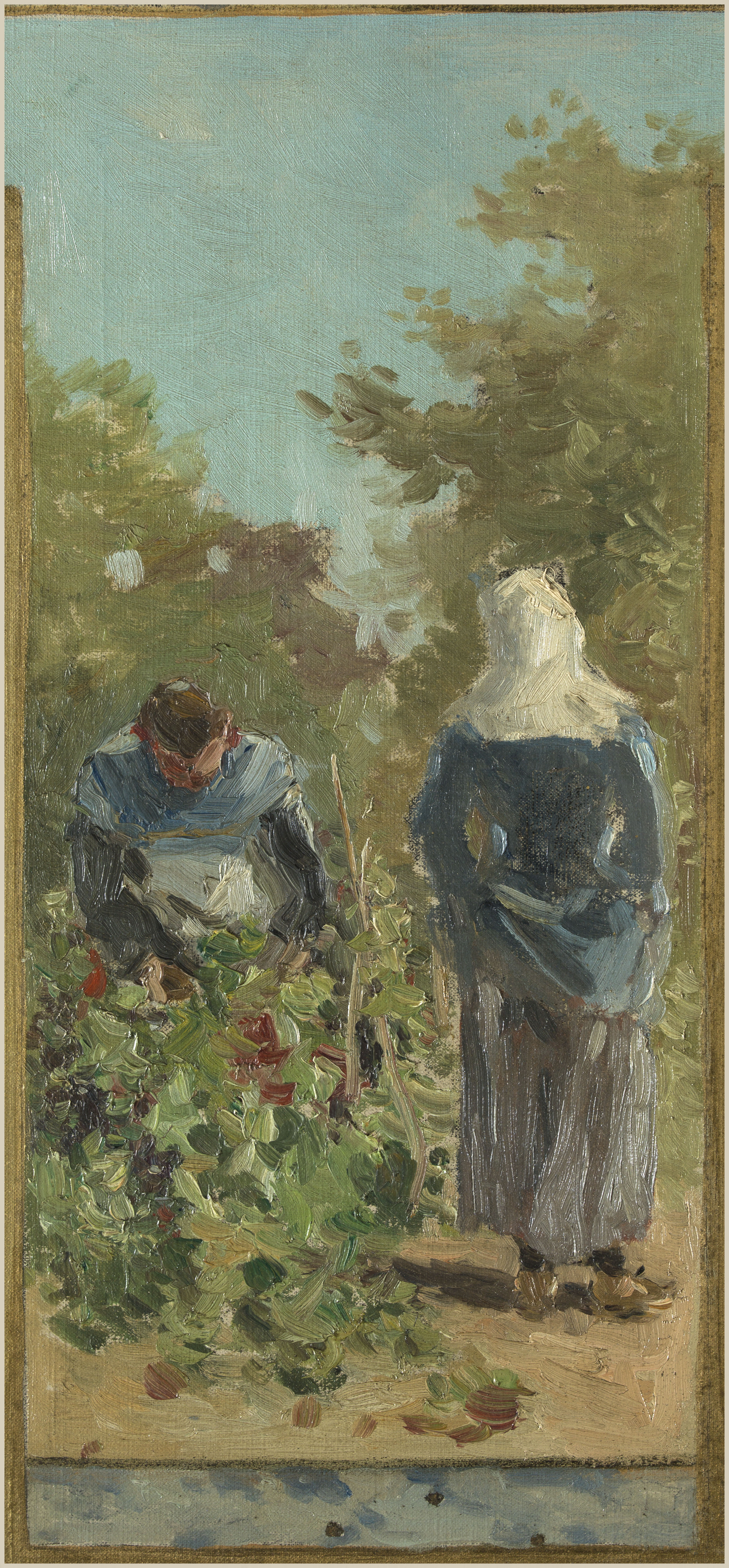
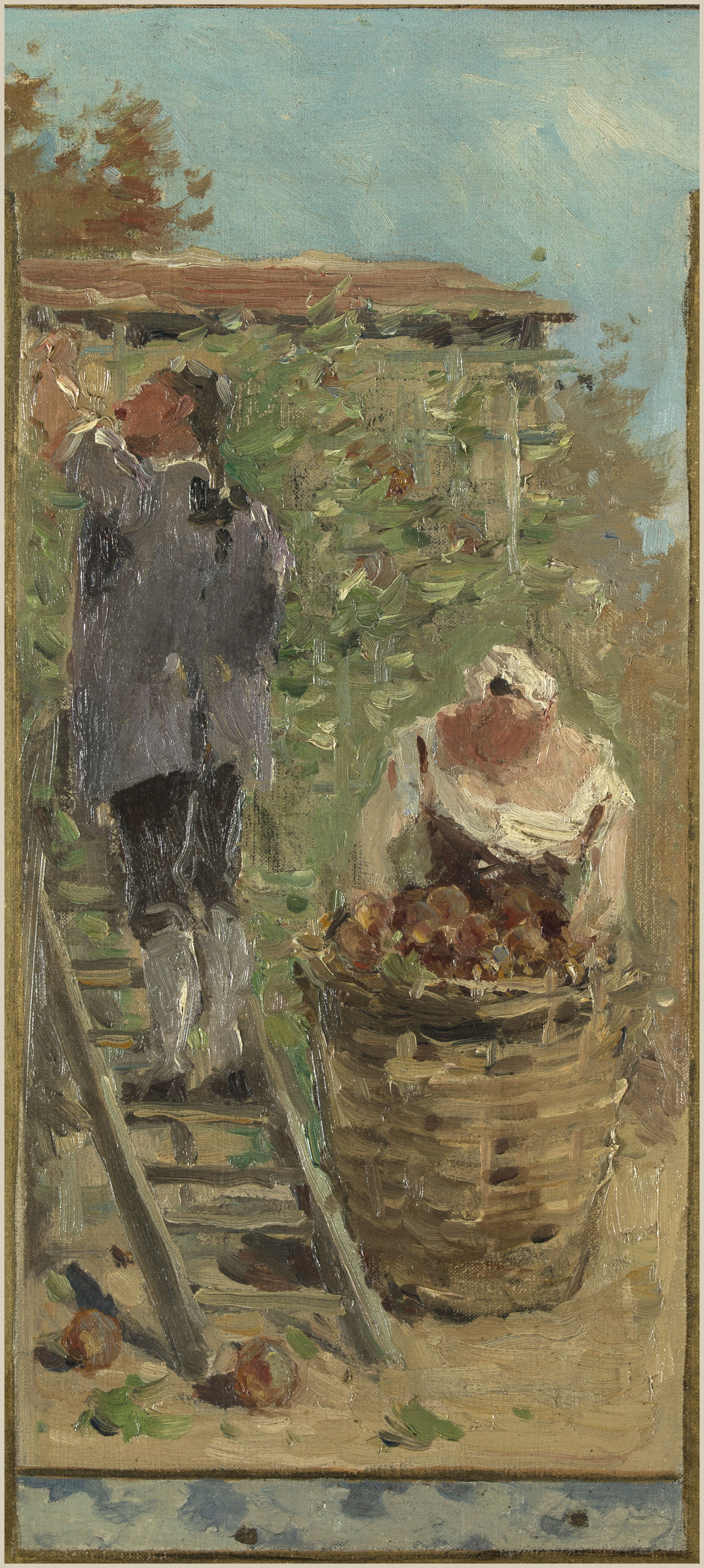
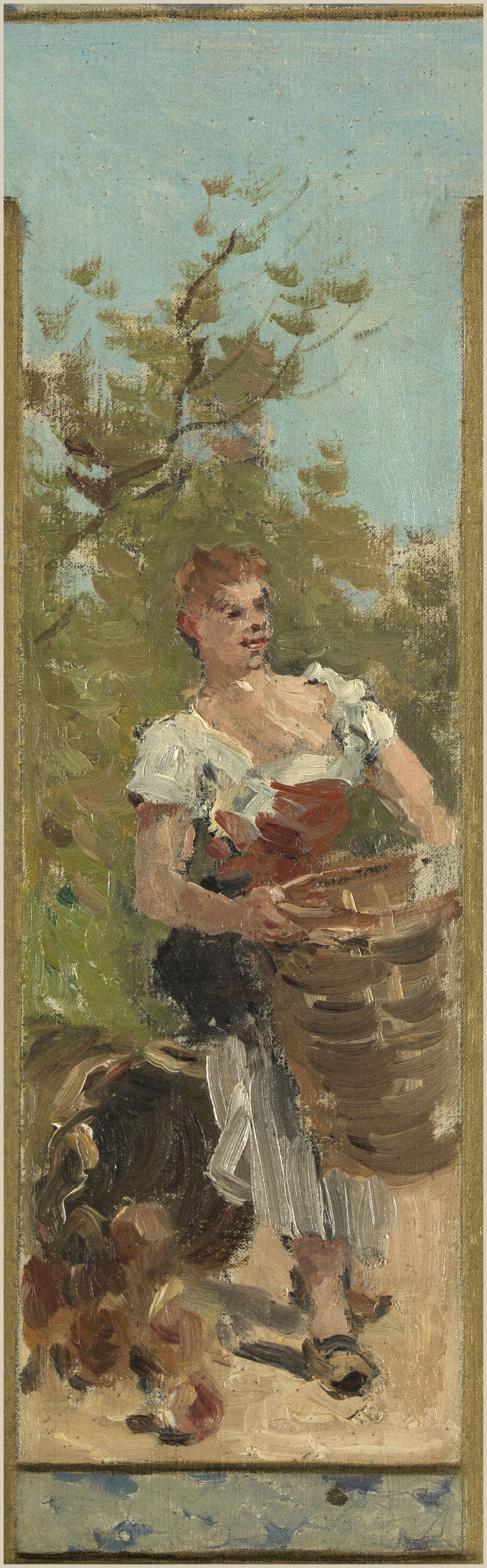
Murals in the Salle des Mariages

Following the French Revolution, the town council initially met at the house of the mayor at the time. This arrangement continued until the council relocated to a house on Rue Sadi-Carnot. In June 1870, the council decided to commission a dedicated town hall. The site they selected was on the west side of Rue des Jardins (now Rue Charles-Graindorge).

Progress was delayed by the Franco-Prussian War of 1870, but the project got underway when the foundation stone for the new building was laid by the local member of the senate, Ferdinand Hérold, on 24 October 1880. The building was designed by C. Monière in the Louis XIII style, built by Messrs Rueff in red brick with stucco finishes and stone dressings, and was officially opened by the mayor, Adrien Benoît Hure, on 17 July 1881.

The design involved a symmetrical main frontage of five bays facing onto Rue des Jardins. The central bay featured a flight of steps leading up to a segmental headed doorway with a moulded surround and a keystone carved in the form of a mask. There was a French door with a stone surround, a pediment and a balustraded balcony on the first floor. The outer bays were fenestrated by casement windows with cornices on the ground floor, and by casement windows with pediments on the first floor. There were Ionic order pilasters on either side of the central bay and at the corners of the building: they supported a frieze, a modillioned cornice and a central clock. The clock was flanked by pilasters supporting a pediment. Internally, the principal room was the Salle des Mariages (wedding room), which was decorated by Pierre Louis Léger Vauthier. His murals depicted local agricultural activities including rose picking, peach picking, harvesting and winegrowing. Meanwhile, the painter, Henri Rachou, created a series of sketches depicting the four seasons in 1893.

During the Paris insurrection, part of the Second World War, members of the French Resistance led by Alphonse Delavois seized the town hall on 19 August 1944. This was six days before the official liberation of the town by the French 2nd Armoured Division, commanded by General Philippe Leclerc, on 25 August 1944.

In the early 21st century, following significant population growth, the council led by the mayor, Marc Everbecq, decided to commission a large extension behind the town hall. The new extension was designed by Jean-Pierre Lott in the modern style, built in concrete and glass at a cost of €40 million and was officially opened on 30 November 2013.

The extension was seven storeys high and incorporated a new double-height Salle du Conseil (council chamber) on the ground floor. A glass bridge was constructed connecting the original building to the extension at first floor level. The mayor's office was installed on the second floor of the extension, while the council officers and their departments were installed on the upper floors of the extension. A futuristic structure, shaped like three pebbles stacked on top of each other, was installed on the south side of the extension.
