= Albert Gleizes =

French painter (1881–1953)

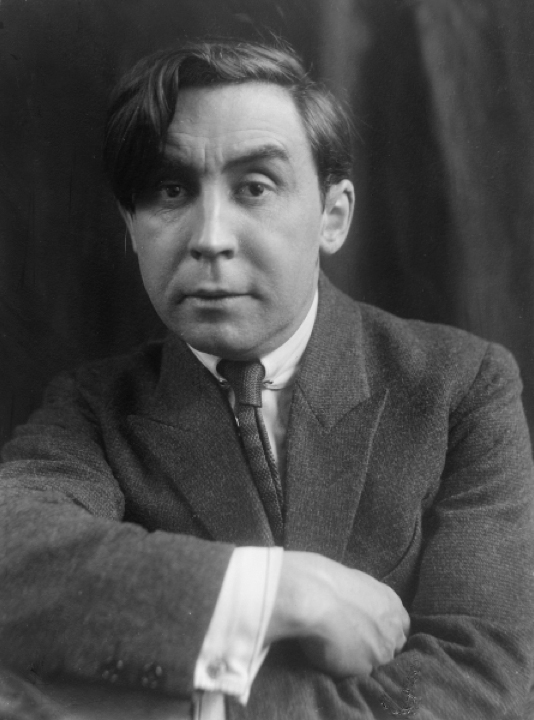
- Albert Gleizes, c. 1920
- Born: Albert Léon Gleizes; 8 December 1881; Paris, France
- Died: 23 June 1953 (aged 71); Saint-Rémy-de-Provence, France
- Known for: Painting, writing
- Notable work: Le Chemin, Paysage à Meudon (1911); Harvest Threshing (1912); Les Baigneuses (1912); Les Joueurs de football (1912–13); Man in a Hammock (1913); Portrait of an Army Doctor (1914–15); Woman with Black Glove (1920)
- Movement: Cubism, Abstract art, Abstraction-Création
- Spouse: Juliette Roche (m. 1915–1953)

Albert Gleizes (French: [albɛʁ ɡlɛz]; 8 December 1881 – 23 June 1953) was a French artist, theoretician, philosopher, a self-proclaimed founder of Cubism and an influence on the School of Paris. Albert Gleizes and Jean Metzinger wrote the first major treatise on Cubism, Du "Cubisme", 1912. Gleizes was a founding member of the Section d'Or group of artists. He was also a member of Der Sturm, and his many theoretical writings were originally most appreciated in Germany, where especially at the Bauhaus his ideas were given thoughtful consideration. Gleizes spent four crucial years in New York, and played an important role in making America aware of modern art. He was a member of the Society of Independent Artists, founder of the Ernest-Renan Association, and both a founder and participant in the Abbaye de Créteil. Gleizes exhibited regularly at Léonce Rosenberg's Galerie de l’Effort Moderne in Paris; he was also a founder, organizer and director of Abstraction-Création. From the mid-1920s to the late 1930s much of his energy went into writing, e.g., La Peinture et ses lois (Paris, 1923), Vers une conscience plastique: La Forme et l’histoire (Paris, 1932) and Homocentrisme (Sablons, 1937).

== Early life ==
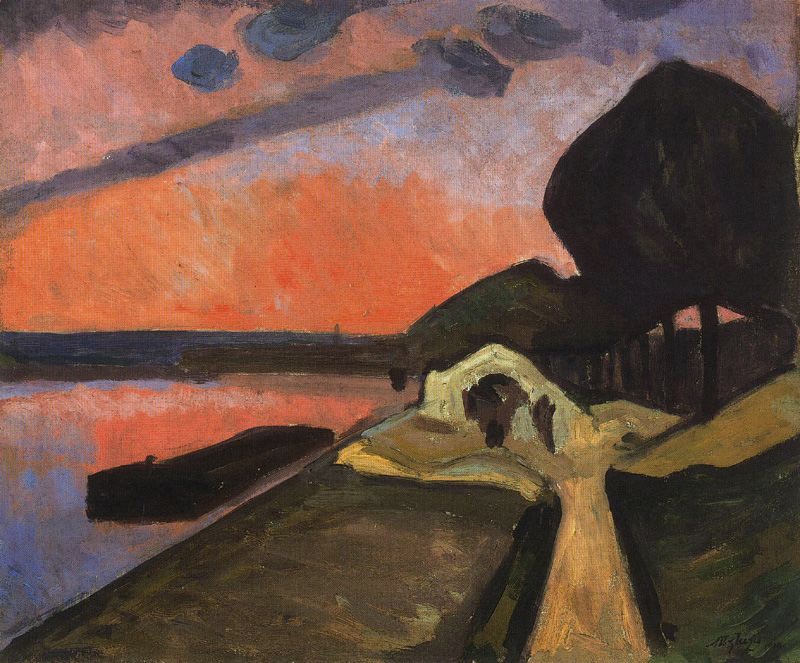
Albert Gleizes, 1909, Bords de la Marne, oil on canvas, 54 x 65 cm, Musée des Beaux Arts de Lyon

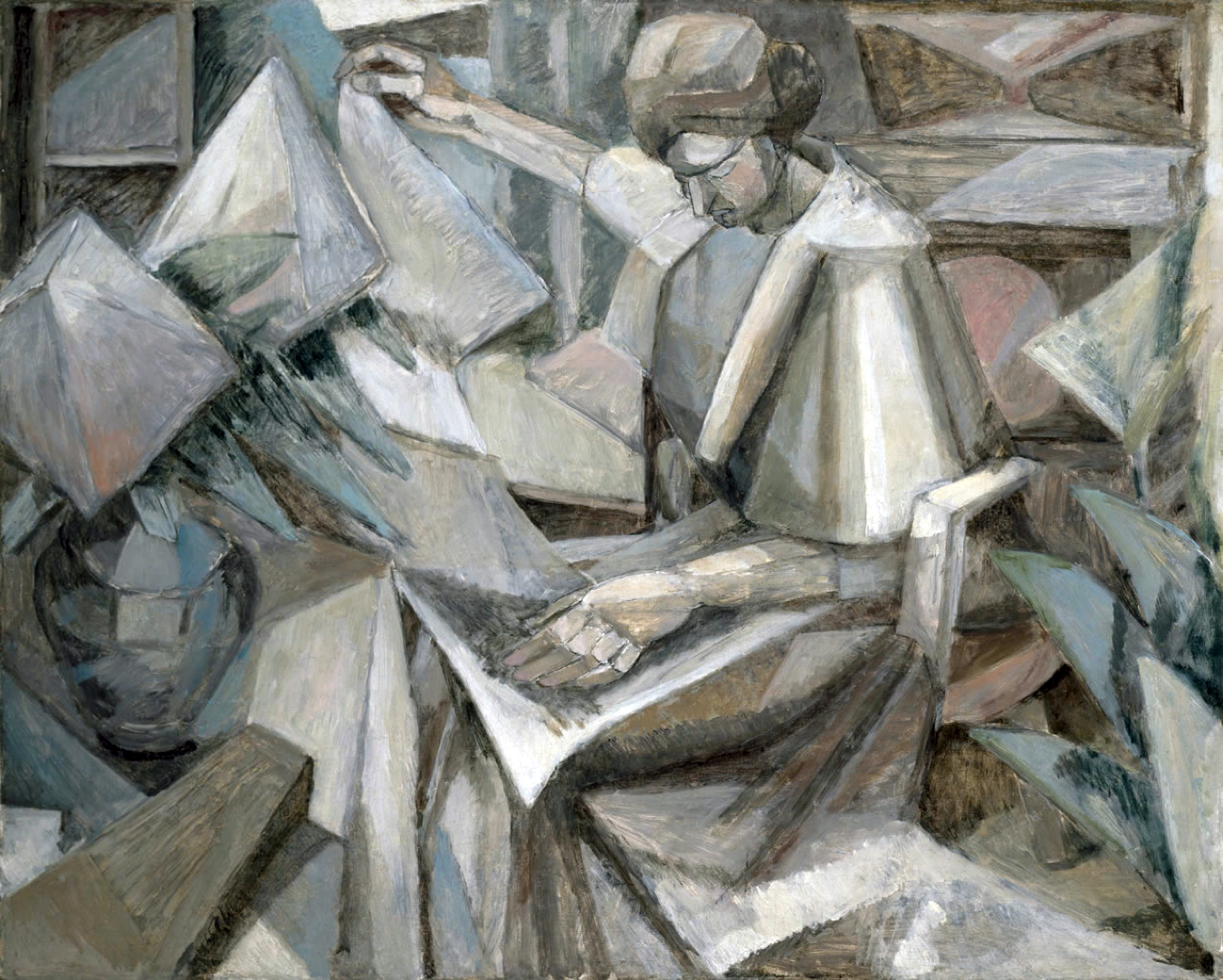
Albert Gleizes, 1910, La Femme aux Phlox (Woman with Phlox), oil on canvas, 81 x 100 cm, exhibited Armory Show, New York, 1913, Museum of Fine Arts, Houston

Born Albert Léon Gleizes and raised in Paris, he was the son of a fabric designer who ran a large industrial design workshop. He was also the nephew of Léon Comerre, a successful portrait painter who won the 1875 Prix de Rome. The young Albert Gleizes did not like school and often skipped classes to idle away the time writing poetry and wandering through the nearby Montmartre cemetery. Finally, after completing his secondary schooling, Gleizes spent four years in the 72nd Infantry Regiment of the French army (Abbeville, Picardie) then began pursuing a career as a painter. Gleizes began to paint self-taught around 1901 in the Impressionist tradition. His first landscapes from around Courbevoie appear particularly inspired by Alfred Sisley or Camille Pissarro. Although clearly related to Pissarro in technique, Gleizes' particular view-points as well as the composition and conception of early works represent a clear departure from the style of late Impressionism. The density with which these works are painted and their solid framework suggest affinities with Divisionism which were often noted by early critics.

Gleizes was only twenty-one years of age when his work titled La Seine à Asnières was exhibited at the Société Nationale des Beaux-Arts in 1902. The following year Gleizes exhibited two paintings at the Salon d'Automne. In 1905 Gleizes was among the founders of l'Association Ernest-Renan, a union of students opposed to military propaganda. Gleizes was in charge of the Section littéraire et artistique, organizing theater productions and poetry readings. At the Musée des Beaux-Arts de Lyon (Salon de la Société Nationale des Beaux-Arts, 1906), Gleizes exhibited Jour de marché en banlieue. Tending towards 1907 his work evolved into a Post-Impressionist style with strong Naturalist and Symbolist components.

Gleizes and others decided to create an association fraternelle d'artistes and rent a large house in Créteil. The Abbaye de Créteil was a self-supporting community of artists that aimed to develop their art free of any commercial concerns. For nearly a year, Gleizes along with other painters, poets, musicians and writers, gathered to create. A lack of income forced them to give up their cherished Abbaye de Créteil in early 1908 and Gleizes moved to 7 rue du Delta near Montmartre, Paris, with artists Amedeo Modigliani, Henri Doucet, Maurice Drouart and Geo Printemps.

In 1908 Gleizes exhibited at the Toison d'Or in Moscow. The same year, showing a great interest in color and reflecting the transient influence of Fauvism, the work of Gleizes became more synthetic with a proto-Cubist component.

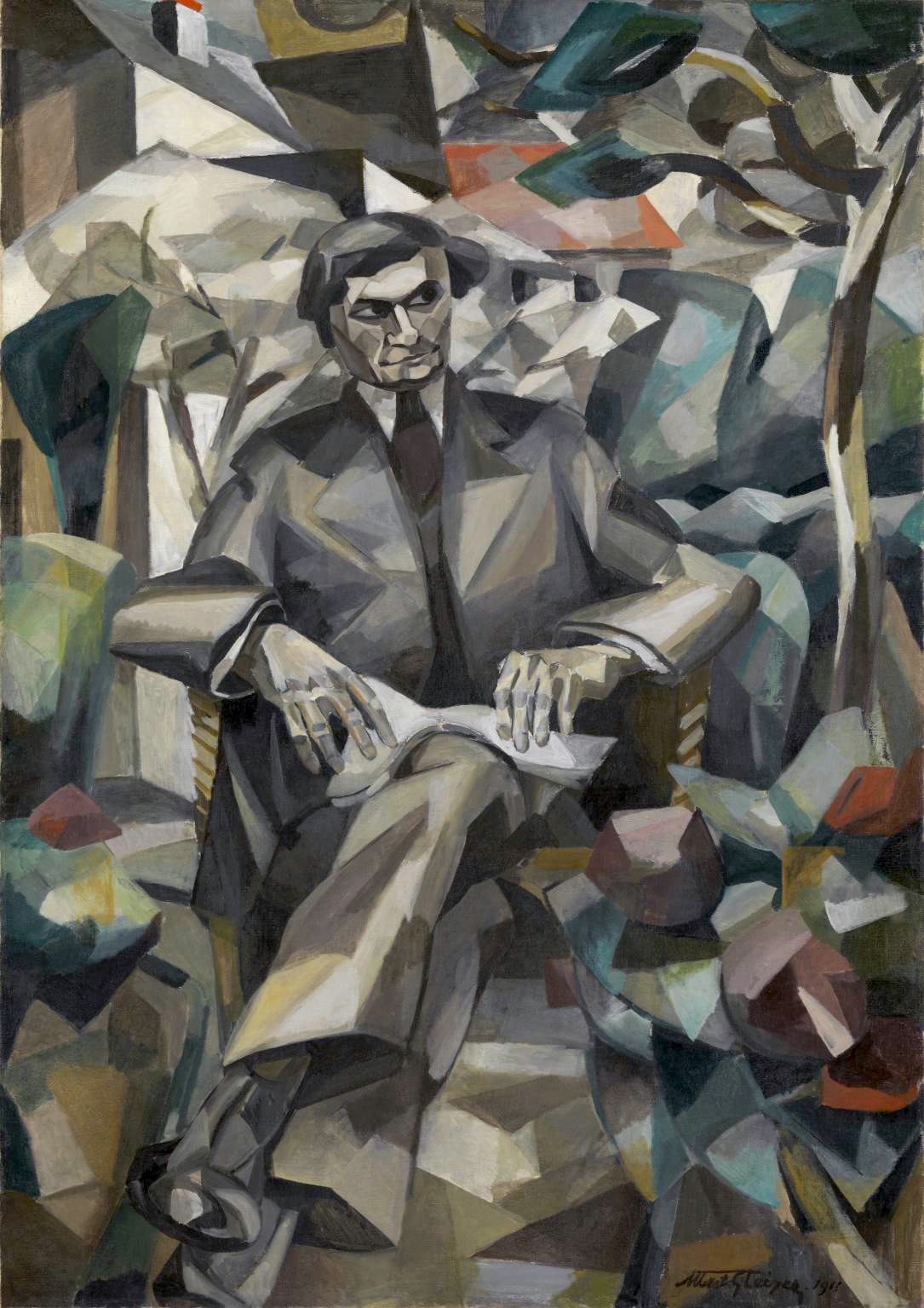
Albert Gleizes, 1911, Portrait de Jacques Nayral, oil on canvas, 161.9 x 114 cm, Tate Modern, London. This painting was reproduced in Fantasio: published 15 October 1911, for the occasion of the Salon d'Automne where it was exhibited the same year.

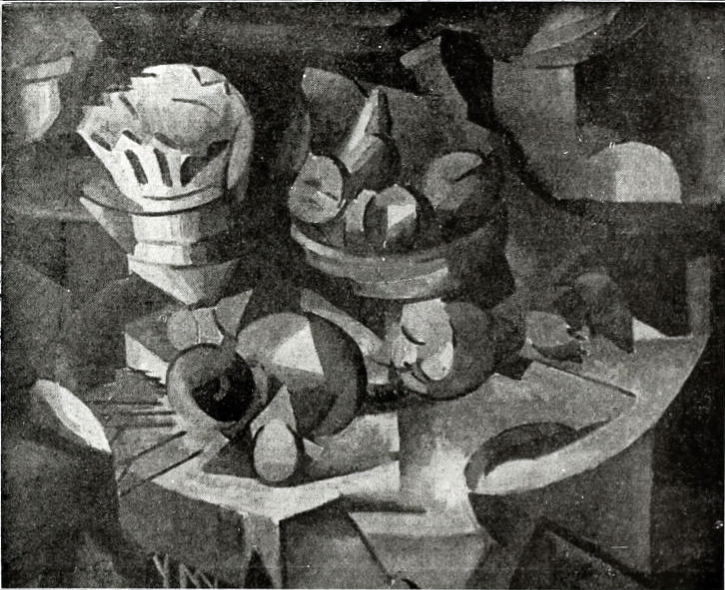
Albert Gleizes, 1911, Stilleben, Nature Morte, Der Sturm postcard, Sammlung Walden, Berlin. Collection Paul Citroen, sold 1928 to Kunstausstellung Der Sturm, requisition by the Nazis in 1937, and missing since

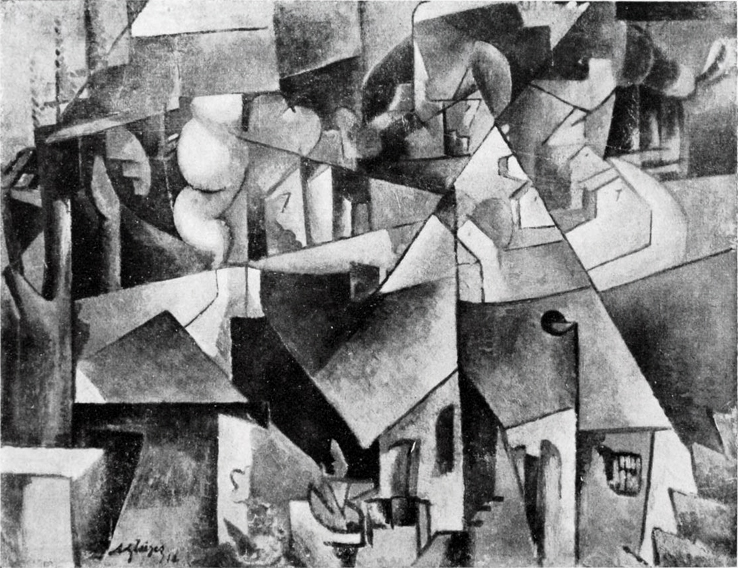
Albert Gleizes, 1912, Landschaft bei Paris, Paysage près de Paris, Paysage de Courbevoie, oil on canvas, 72.8 x 87.1 cm, missing from Hannover since 1937

Gleizes' Fauve-like period was very brief, lasting several months, and even when his paint was thickest and color brightest, his concern for structural rhythms and simplification was dominant. His geometric simplifications at this time were more akin to Pont-Aven School and Les Nabis principles than to Paul Cézanne. His landscapes of 1909 are characterized by the reducing of forms of nature to primary shapes.

During the summer of the same year his style became linear and stripped, broken down into multiple forms and facets with attenuated colors, close to that of the painter Henri Le Fauconnier. In 1910 a group began to form which included Gleizes, Metzinger, Fernand Léger and Robert Delaunay. They met regularly at Henri le Fauconnier's studio on rue Notre-Dame-des-Champs, near the Boulevard de Montparnasse. These soirées would often included writers such as Guillaume Apollinaire, Roger Allard, René Arcos, Paul Fort, Pierre-Jean Jouve, Alexandre Mercereau, Jules Romains and André Salmon. Together with other young painters, the group wanted to emphasise a research into form, in opposition to the Neo-Impressionist emphasis on color. From 1910 onwards, Albert Gleizes was directly involved with Cubism, both as an artist and a principal theorist of the movement.

== Cubism ==
=== The crucial years ===
Gleizes' involvement in Cubism saw him exhibit at the twenty-sixth Salon des Indépendants in 1910. He showed his Portrait de René Arcos and L'Arbre, two paintings in which the emphasis on simplified form had already begun to overwhelm the representational interest of the paintings. The same tendency is evident in Jean Metzinger's Portrait of Apollinaire in the same Salon. When Louis Vauxcelles wrote his initial review of the Salon, he made a passing and imprecise reference to Gleizes, Jean Metzinger, Robert Delaunay, Fernand Léger and Henri le Fauconnier, as "ignorant geometers, reducing the human body, the site, to pallid cubes."

Guillaume Apollinaire, in his account of the same salon at the Grand Palais (in L'Intransigeant, 18 March 1910) remarked "with joy" that the general sense of the exhibition signifies "La déroute de l'impressionnisme," in reference to the works of a conspicuous group of artists (Gleizes, Delaunay, Le Fauconnier, Metzinger, André Lhote and Marie Laurencin). In Gleizes' paintings of the crucial year 1910, writes Daniel Robbins, "we see the artist's volumetric approach to Cubism and his successful union of a broad field of vision with a flat picture plane. [...] The effort to grasp the intricate rhythms of a panorama resulted in a comprehensive geometry of intersecting and overlapping forms which created a new and more dynamic quality of movement.

Gleizes exhibited at the 1910 Salon d'Automne with the same artists, followed by the first organized group showing by Cubists, in Salle 41 of the 1911 Salon des Indépendants (La Femme aux Phlox (Woman with Phlox)) together with Metzinger, Delaunay, Le Fauconnier and Léger. The result was a public scandal which brought Cubism for the first time to the attention of the general public (in contrast, Picasso and Braque were exhibiting in a private gallery and selling to a small circle of connoisseurs). In a review of the 1911 Indépendants published in Le Petit Parisien (23 April 1911), critic Jean Claude writes:

Then there is Le Fauconnier, who, jealous of the Cubist Metzinger, became trapezoid… and painted something of the sort he titled, I think, L’Abondance… Metzinger himself painted nudes thatlook like puzzles, the pieces of which are cubes of various sizes; F. Léger lacking originality, adopted stove pipes [tuyau de poêle] as a means of reproduction of the human figure… The other, which I have never been able to guess the name, uses small checkerboards, gray and white, white and black, gray and brown, pink and black, and painted an Eiffel Tower flanked on the ground undoubtedly to crush houses, which, while dancing the cancan, stuffed their chimneys through the windows. A talented artist, Albert Gleizes, also allowed himself to try a trianguliste representation of the human figure. This is sad, deeply.

At the 1911 Salon d'Automne (room 8), Gleizes exhibited his Portrait de Jacques Nayral and La Chasse (The Hunt), with, in addition to the group of Salle 41, André Lhote, Marcel Duchamp, Jacques Villon, Roger de La Fresnaye and André Dunoyer de Segonzac. In the fall of that year, though the intermediary of Apollinaire, he met Pablo Picasso for the first time and joined the Puteaux Group which held meetings in the studio of Jacques Villon (Gaston Duchamp) and also included Villon's brothers, Raymond Duchamp-Villon and Marcel Duchamp, amongst others. Many of these artists also frequented the cafés Le Dôme, La Closerie des Lilas, La Rotonde, Le Select, and La Coupole in Montparnasse.

People crowded into our room, they shouted, they laughed, they got worked up, they protested, they luxuriated in all kinds of utterances. (Albert Gleizes, on the Salon d'Automne exhibition of 1911)

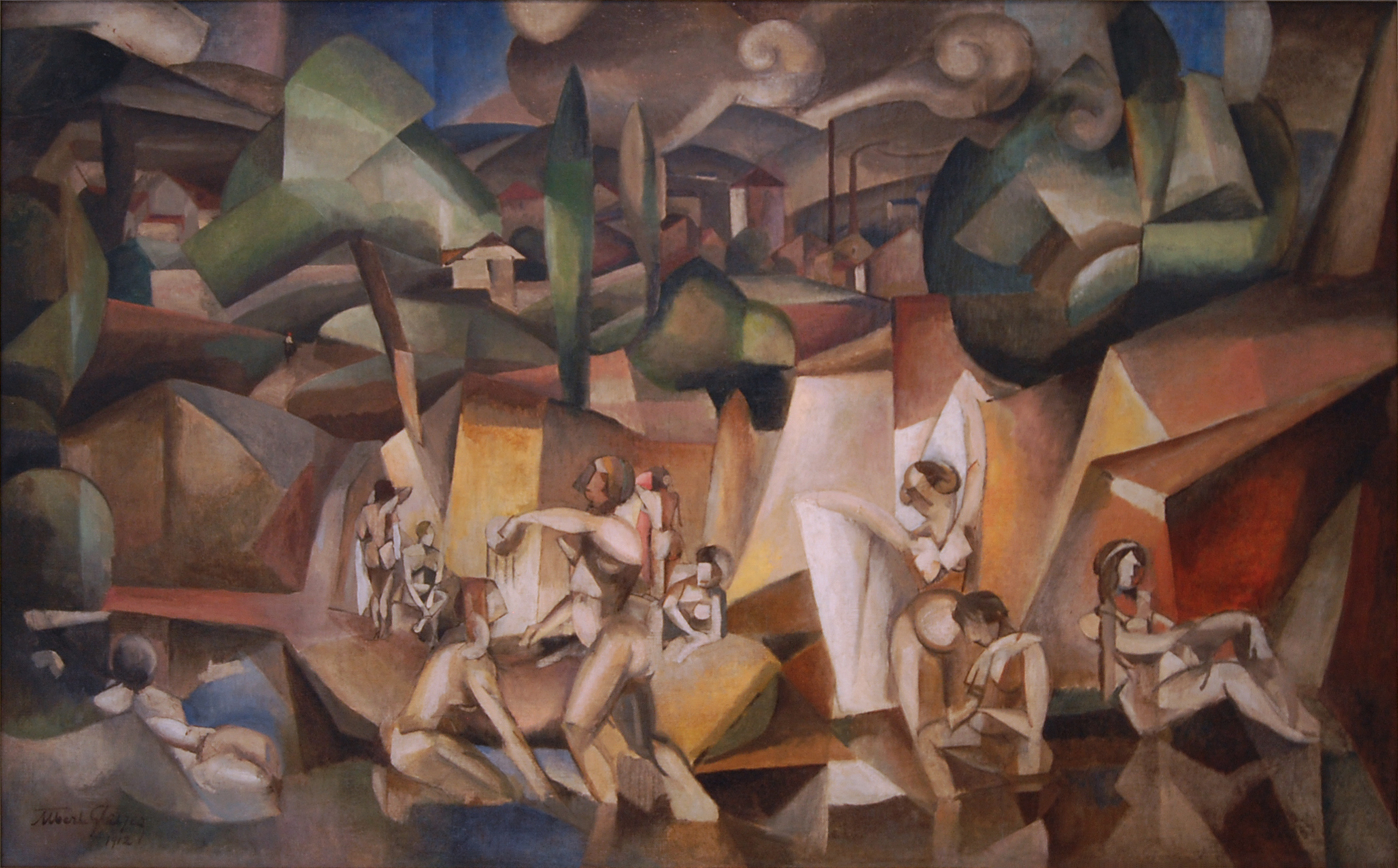
Albert Gleizes, 1912, Les Baigneuses (The Bathers), oil on canvas, 105 x 171 cm, Musée d'Art Moderne de la Ville de Paris

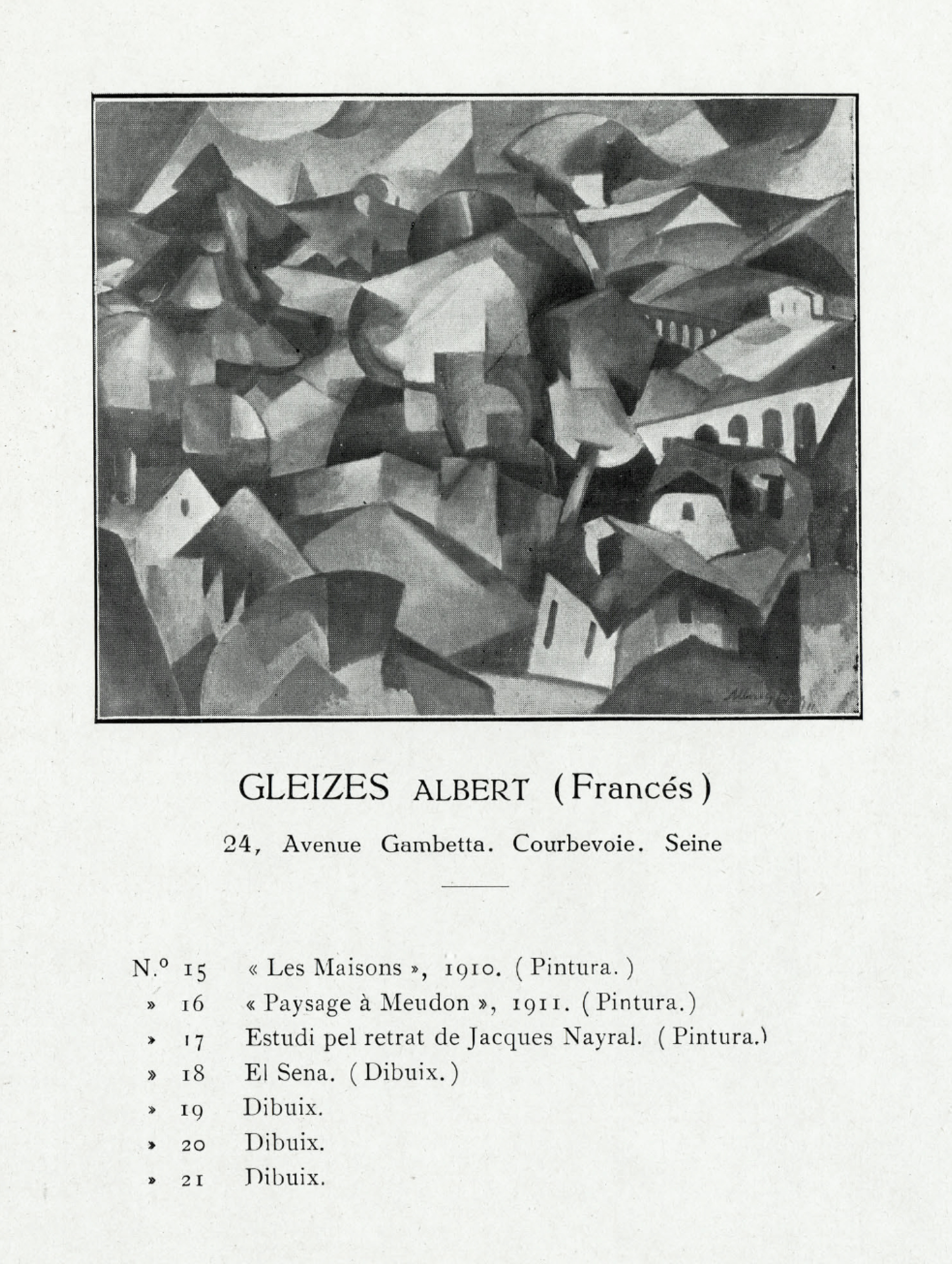
Albert Gleizes, Les Maison, Landscape (1910-11), Exposició d'Art Cubista, Galeries Dalmau, 1912, catalogue entry

Gleizes exhibited his Les Baigneuses (The Bathers) at the 1912 Salon des Indépendants; a show marked by Marcel Duchamp's Nude Descending a Staircase, No. 2, which itself caused a scandal even amongst the Cubists (Duchamp removed the painting before the opening of the exhibition). This was followed by a group show at the Galeries Dalmau in Barcelona, the first exhibition of Cubism in Spain, another exhibit in Moscow (Valet de Carreau), the Salon de la Société Normande in Rouen, and the Salon de la Section d'Or, October 1912 at the Galerie de la Boétie in Paris.

From 1911 through 1912, drawing to some extent on theories of Henri Poincaré, Ernst Mach, Charles Henry and Henri Bergson, Gleizes began to represent the object, no longer considered from a specific point of view, but rebuilt following a selection of successive viewpoints (i.e., as if viewed simultaneously from numerous viewpoints, and in four-dimensions). This technique of relative motion is pushed to its highest degree of complexity in the monumental Le Dépiquage des Moissons (Harvest Threshing) (1912). This ambitious work, with Delaunay's La Ville de Paris (City of Paris), is one of the largest paintings in the history of Cubism.

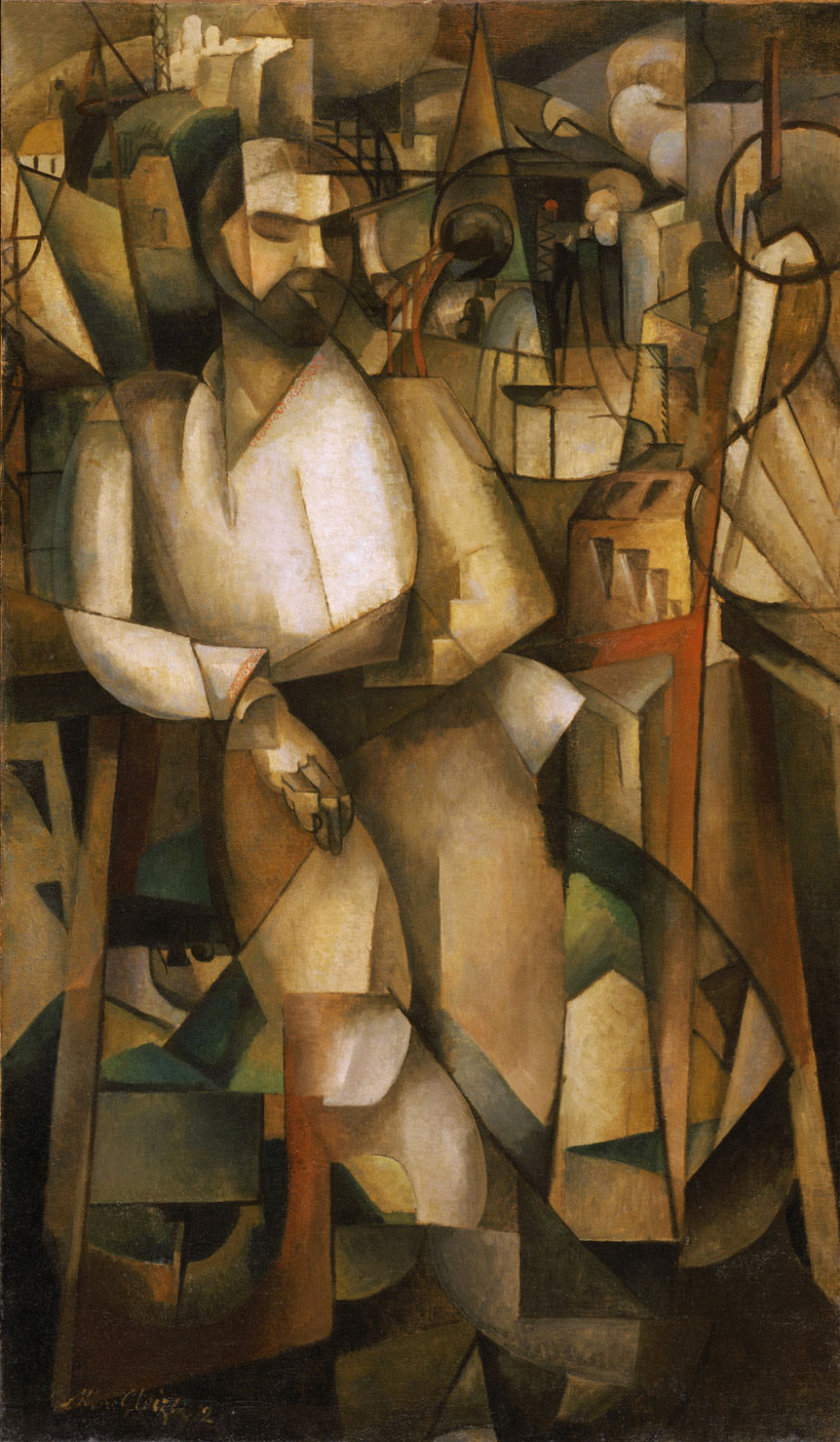
Albert Gleizes, 1912, L'Homme au Balcon, Man on a Balcony (Portrait of Dr. Théo Morinaud), oil on canvas, 195.6 x 114.9 cm (77 x 45 1/4 in.), Philadelphia Museum of Art. Exhibited at Salon d'Automne, Paris, 1912, Armory Show, New York, Chicago, Boston, 1913. Purchased from the Armory Show by Arthur Jerome Eddy

At the Salon d'Automne of 1912 Gleizes exhibited L'Homme au Balcon (Man on a Balcony), now at the Philadelphia Museum of Art. The Cubist contribution to the 1912 Salon d'Automne created a controversy in the Municipal Council of Paris, leading to a debate in the Chambre des Députés about the use of public funds to provide the venue for such barbaric art. The Cubists were defended by the Socialist deputy, Marcel Sembat. Albert Gleizes and Jean Metzinger, in preparation for the Salon de la Section d'Or, published a major defence of Cubism, resulting in the first theoretical essay on the new movement, entitled Du "Cubisme" (published by Eugène Figuière in 1912, translated to English and Russian in 1913).

=== Theory ===
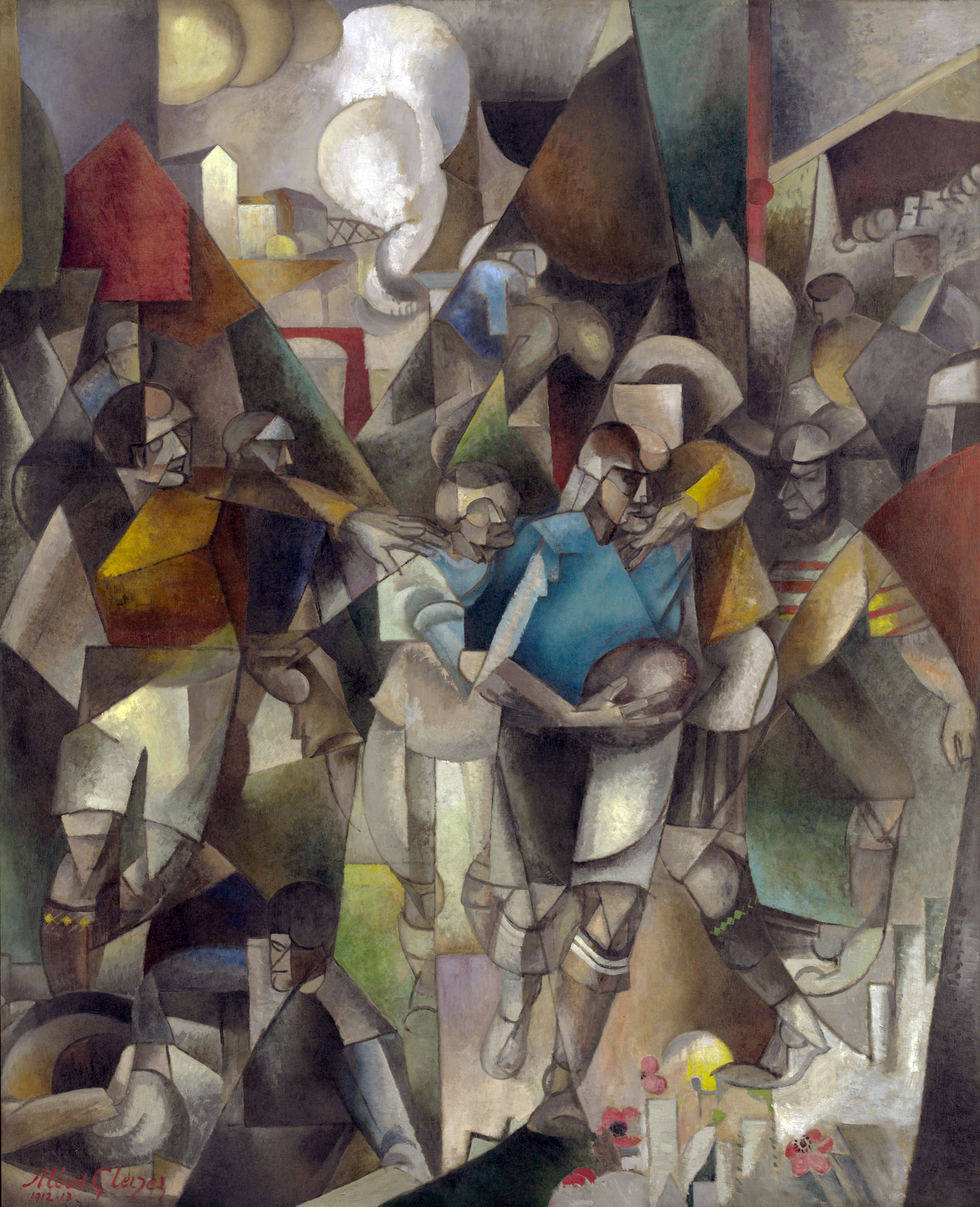
Albert Gleizes, 1912–13, Les Joueurs de football (Football Players), oil on canvas, 225.4 cm × 183 cm (88.7 in × 72.0 in), National Gallery of Art, Washington D.C.

In Du "Cubisme" Gleizes and Metzinger wrote: "If we wished to relate the space of the [Cubist] painters to geometry, we should have to refer it to the non-Euclidean mathematicians; we should have to study, at some length, certain of Riemann's theorems." Cubism itself, then, was not based on any geometrical theory, but corresponded better to non-Euclidean geometry than classical or Euclidean geometry. The essential was in the understanding of space other than by the classical method of perspective; an understanding that would include and integrate the fourth dimension. Cubism, with its new geometry, its dynamism and multiple view-point perspective, not only represented a departure from Euclid's model, but it achieved, according to Gleizes and Metzinger, a better representation of the real world: one that was mobile and changing in time. For Gleizes, Cubism represented a "normal evolution of an art that was mobile like life itself." In contrast to Picasso and Braque, Gleizes' intent was not to analyze and describe visual reality. Gleizes had argued that we cannot know the external world, we can only know our sensations. Objects from daily life⎯guitar, pipe or bowl of fruit⎯ did not satisfy his complex idealistic concepts of the physical world. His subjects were of vast scale and of provocative social and cultural meaning. Gleizes' iconography (as of Delaunay, Le Fauconnier and Léger) helps to explain why there is no period in his work corresponding to analytic Cubism, and how it was possible for Gleizes to become an abstract painter, more theoretically in tune with Kandinsky and Mondrian than Picasso and Braque, who remained associated with visual reality.

Gleizes' intent was to reconstitute and synthesize the real world according to his individual consciousness (sensations), through the use of volumes to convey the solidity and structure of objects. Their weight, placement and effects upon each other, and the inseparability of form and color, was one of the principal lessons of Cézanne. Forms were simplified and distorted, each shape and color modified by another, rather than splintered. His concern was to establish weight, density and volumetric relationships among sections of a broad subject. Gleizes himself characterized the 1910–11 phase of his work as an "analysis of volume relationships," though it bears little relation to the traditional use of the word "analytical" in our understanding of Cubism.

"We laugh out loud when we think of all the novices who expiate their literal understanding of the remarks of a cubist and their faith in absolute truth by laboriously placing side by side the six faces of a cube and both ears of a model seen in profile." (Albert Gleizes, Jean Metzinger)

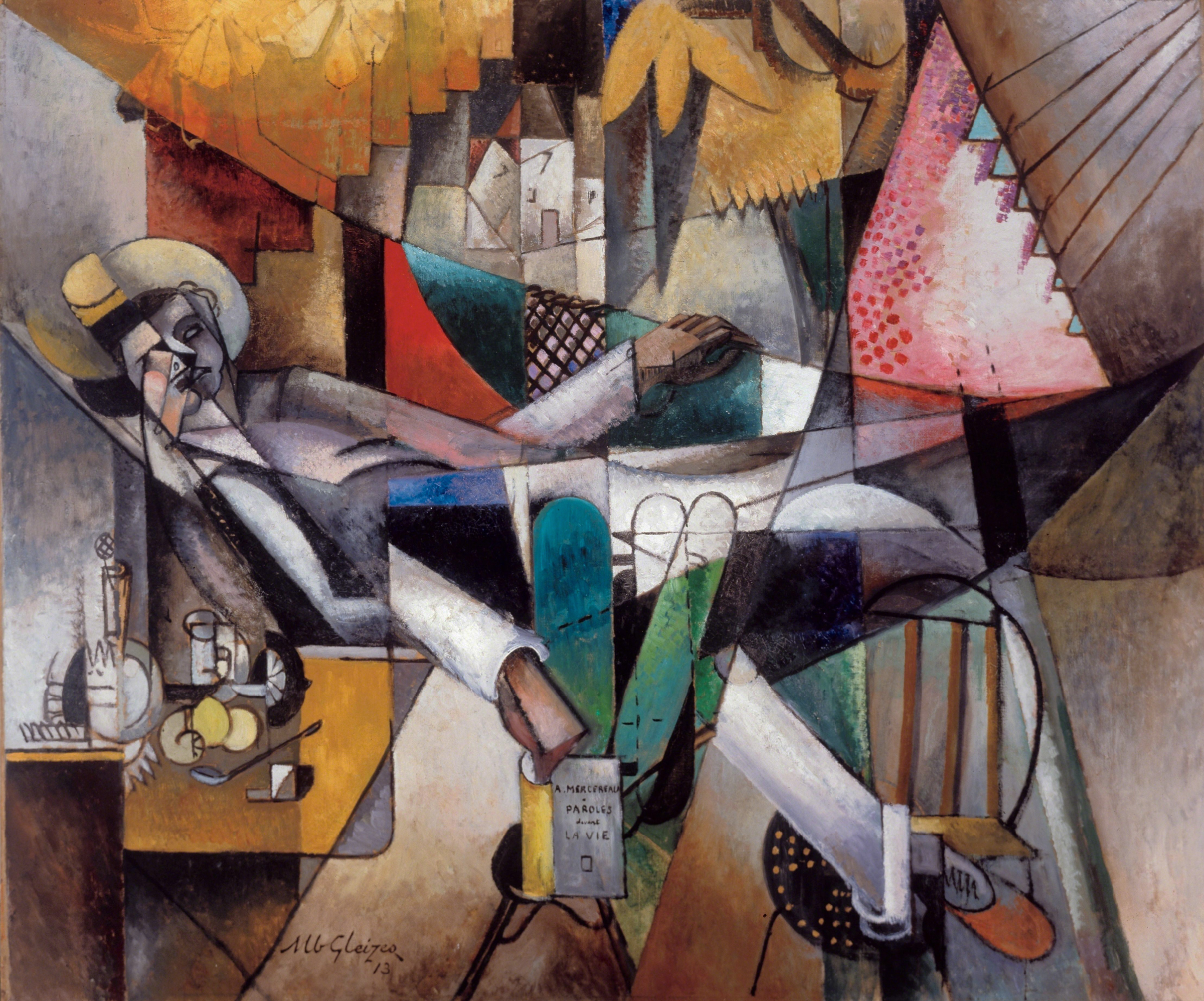
Albert Gleizes, 1913, L'Homme au Hamac (Man in a Hammock), oil on canvas, 130 x 155.5 cm, Albright-Knox Art Gallery, Buffalo, New York

A central theme of Du "Cubisme" was that access to the true essence of the world could be gained by sensations alone. The sensation offered by classical painting was very limited: to only one point of view, from a single point in space and frozen in time. But the real world is mobile, both spatially and temporally. Classical perspective and the formulations of Euclidean geometry were only conventions (to use Poincaré's term) that distance us from the truth of our sensations, from the truth of our own human nature. Man sees the world of natural phenomena from a multitude of angles that form a continuum of sensations in perpetual and continuous change. The Cubists' aim was to completely eschew absolute space and time in favor of relative motion, to grasp through sensory appearances and translate onto a flat canvas the dynamical properties of the four-dimensional manifold (the natural world). Only then could one achieve a better representation of the mobile reality of our living experience. If Gleizes and Metzinger write in Du "Cubisme" that we can only know our sensations, it is not because they wish to disregard them, but, on the contrary, to understand them more deeply as the primary source for their own work. In reasoning this way, Gleizes and Metzinger demonstrate that they are successors to Cézanne, who insists that everything must be learnt from nature: "Nature seen and nature felt... both of which must unite in order to endure."

=== 1913–1918 ===
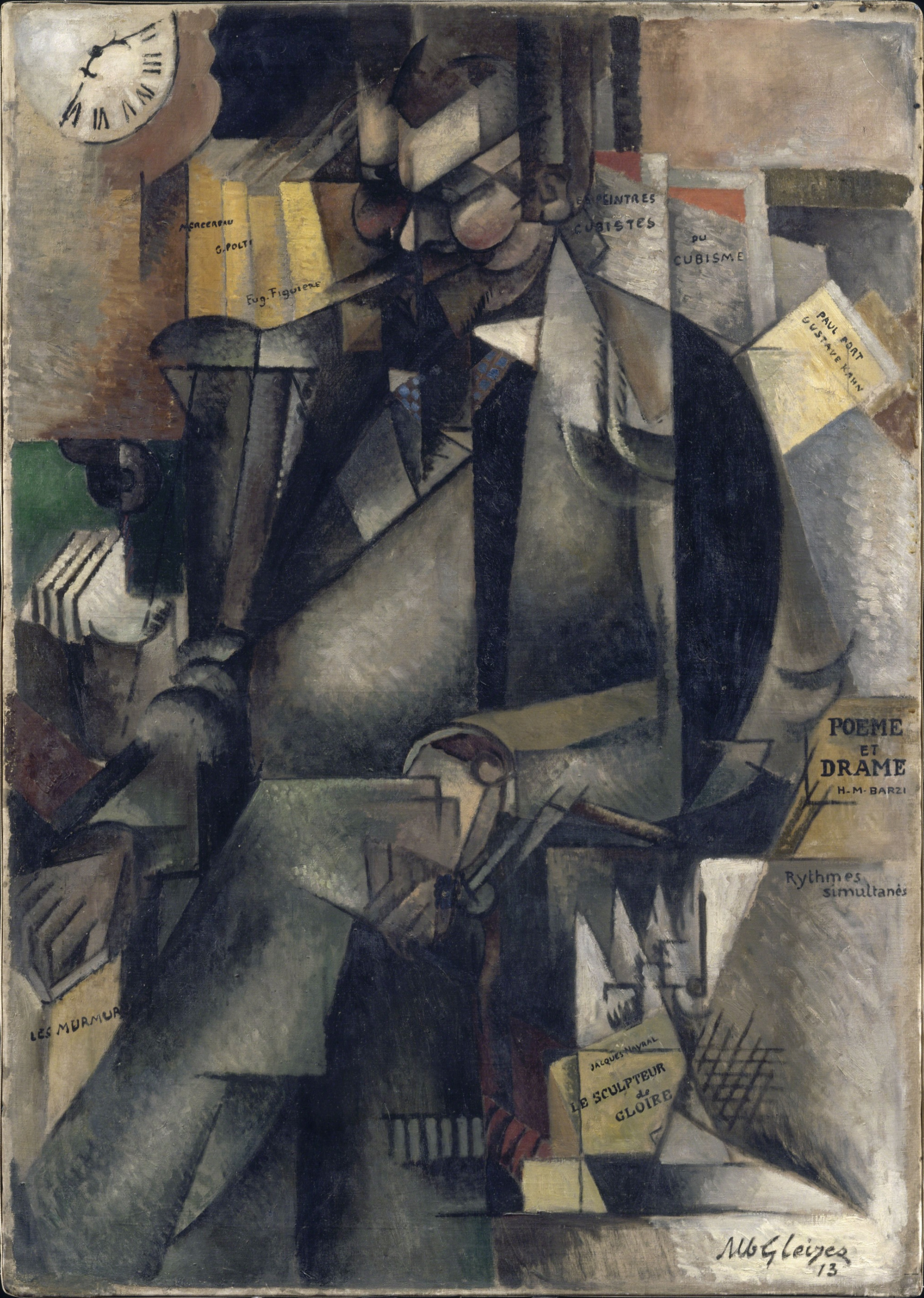
Albert Gleizes, 1913, Portrait de l’éditeur Eugène Figuière (The Publisher Eugene Figuiere), oil on canvas, 143.5 x 101.5 cm, Musée des Beaux-Arts de Lyon

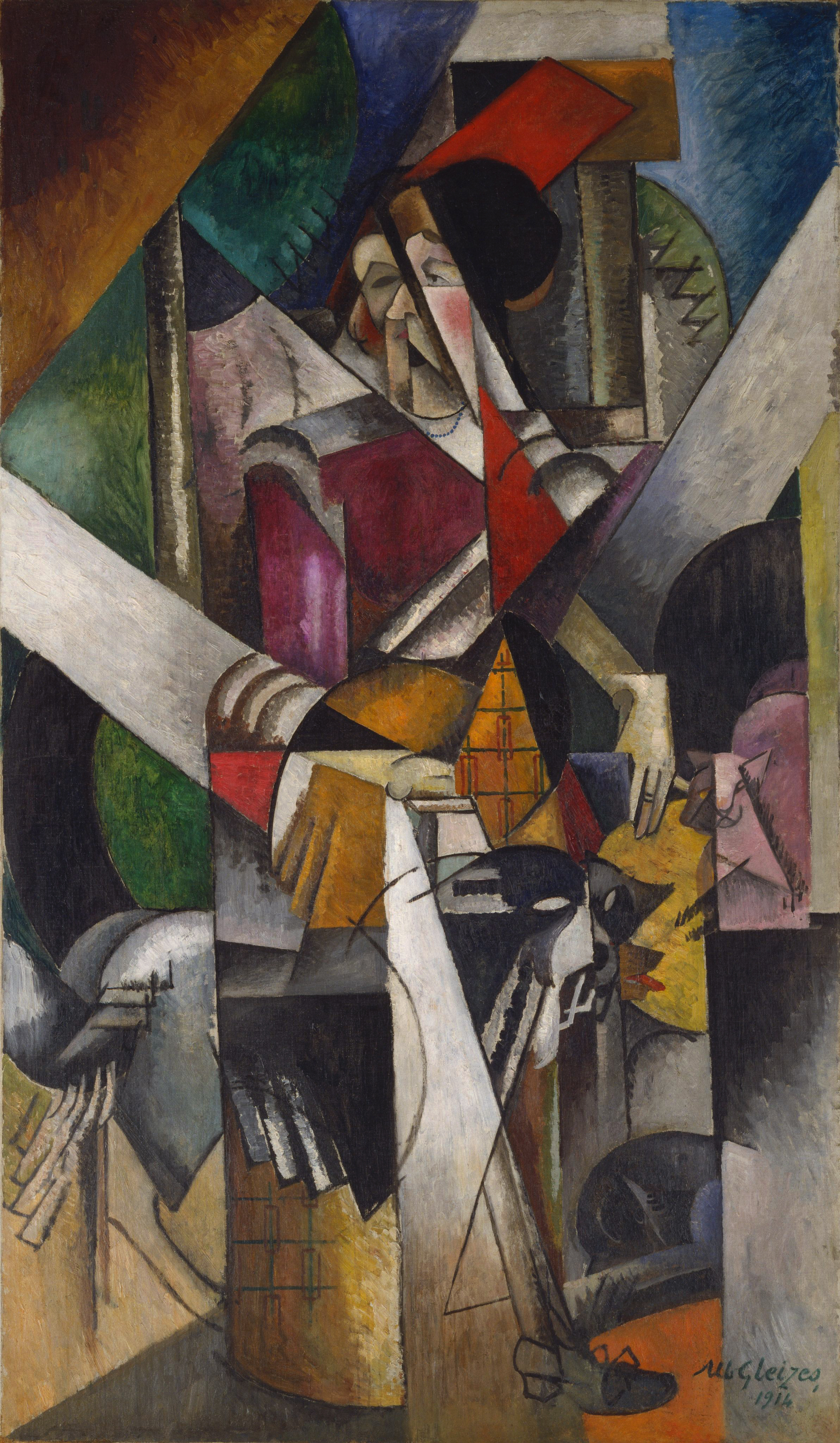
Albert Gleizes, 1914, Woman with animals (La dame aux bêtes) Madame Raymond Duchamp-Villon, oil on canvas, 77 5/16 x 45 15/16 inches (196.4 x 114.1 cm). The Solomon R. Guggenheim Foundation, Peggy Guggenheim Collection, Venice

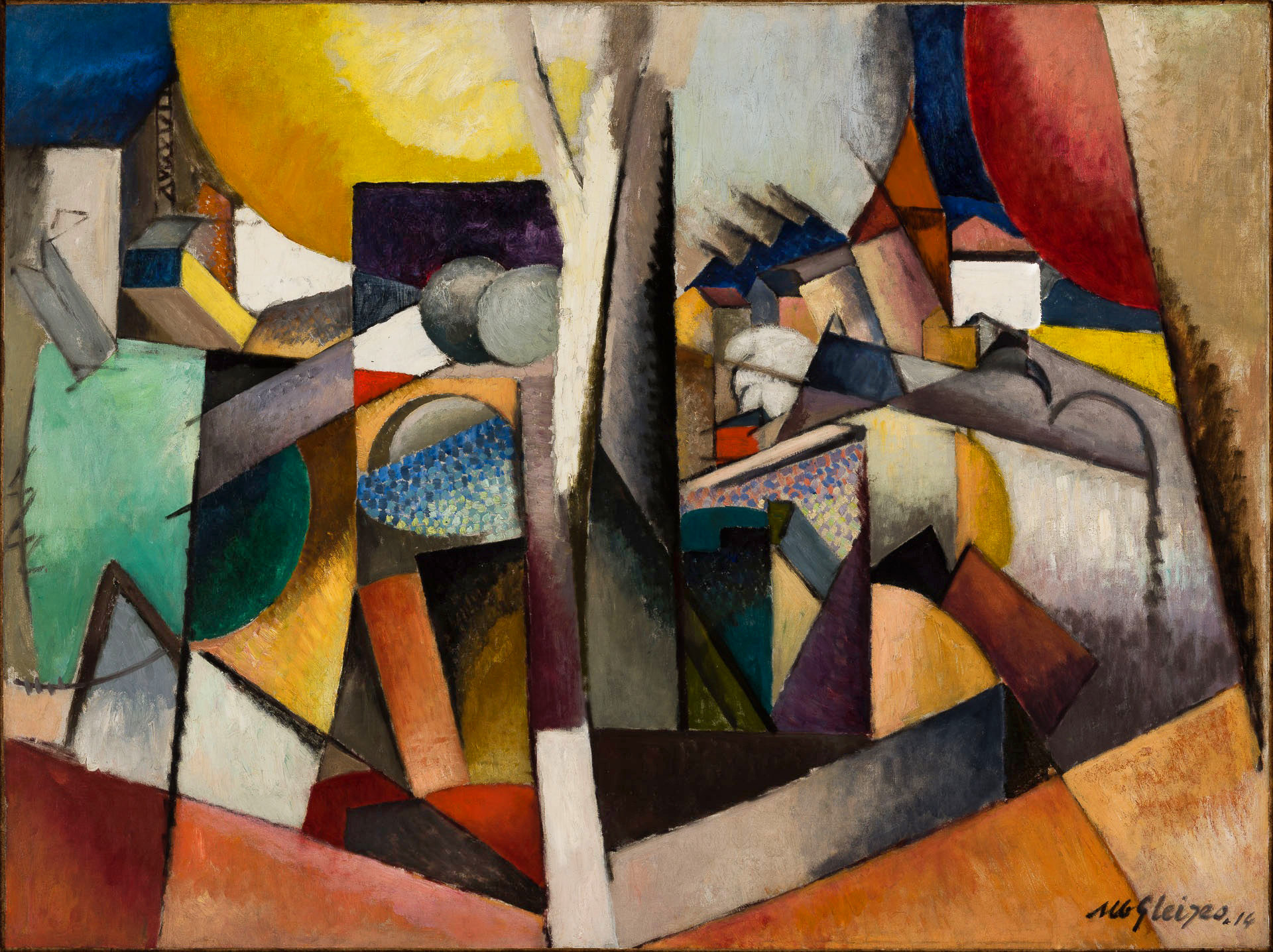
Albert Gleizes, 1914, Paysage cubiste, Arbre et fleuve (Cubist Landscape), oil on canvas, 97 x 130 cm, published in Der Sturm, 5 October 1920

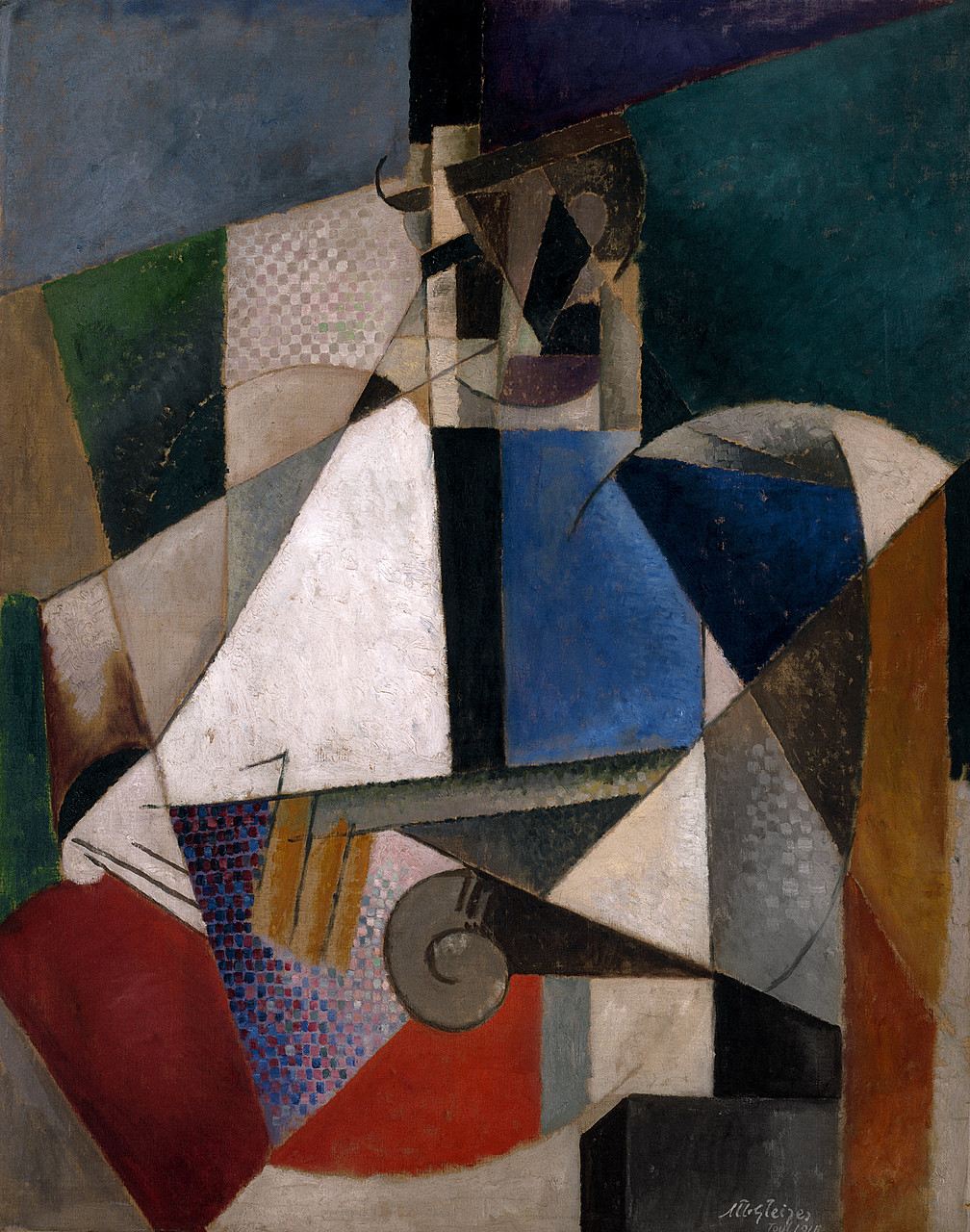
Albert Gleizes, 1914–15, Portrait of an Army Doctor (Portrait d'un médecin militaire), oil on canvas, 119.8 x 95.1 cm, Solomon R. Guggenheim Museum

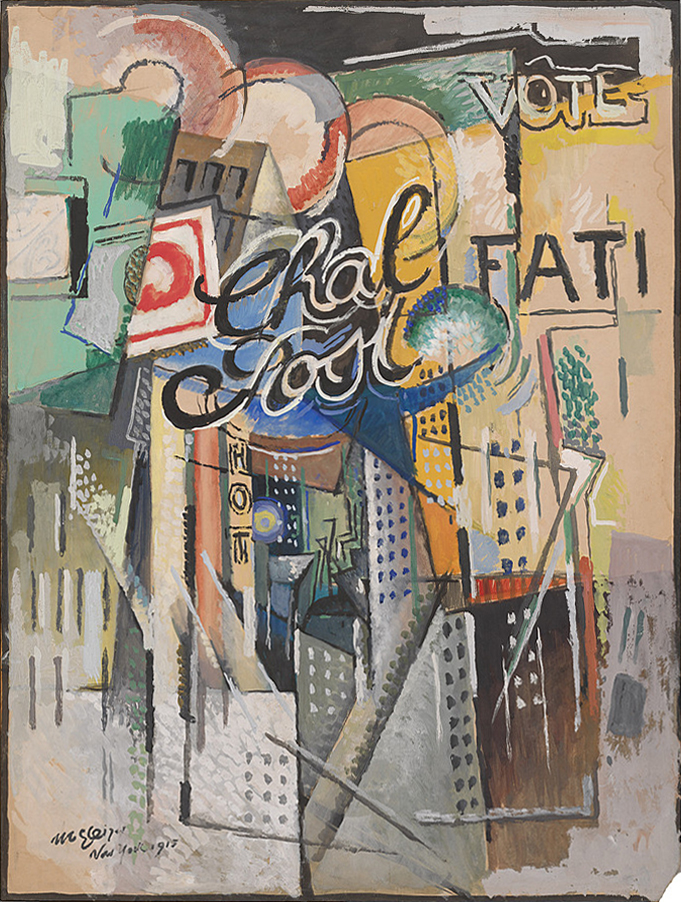
Albert Gleizes, 1915, Chal Post, oil and gouache on board, 101.8 x 76.5 cm, Solomon R. Guggenheim Museum, New York

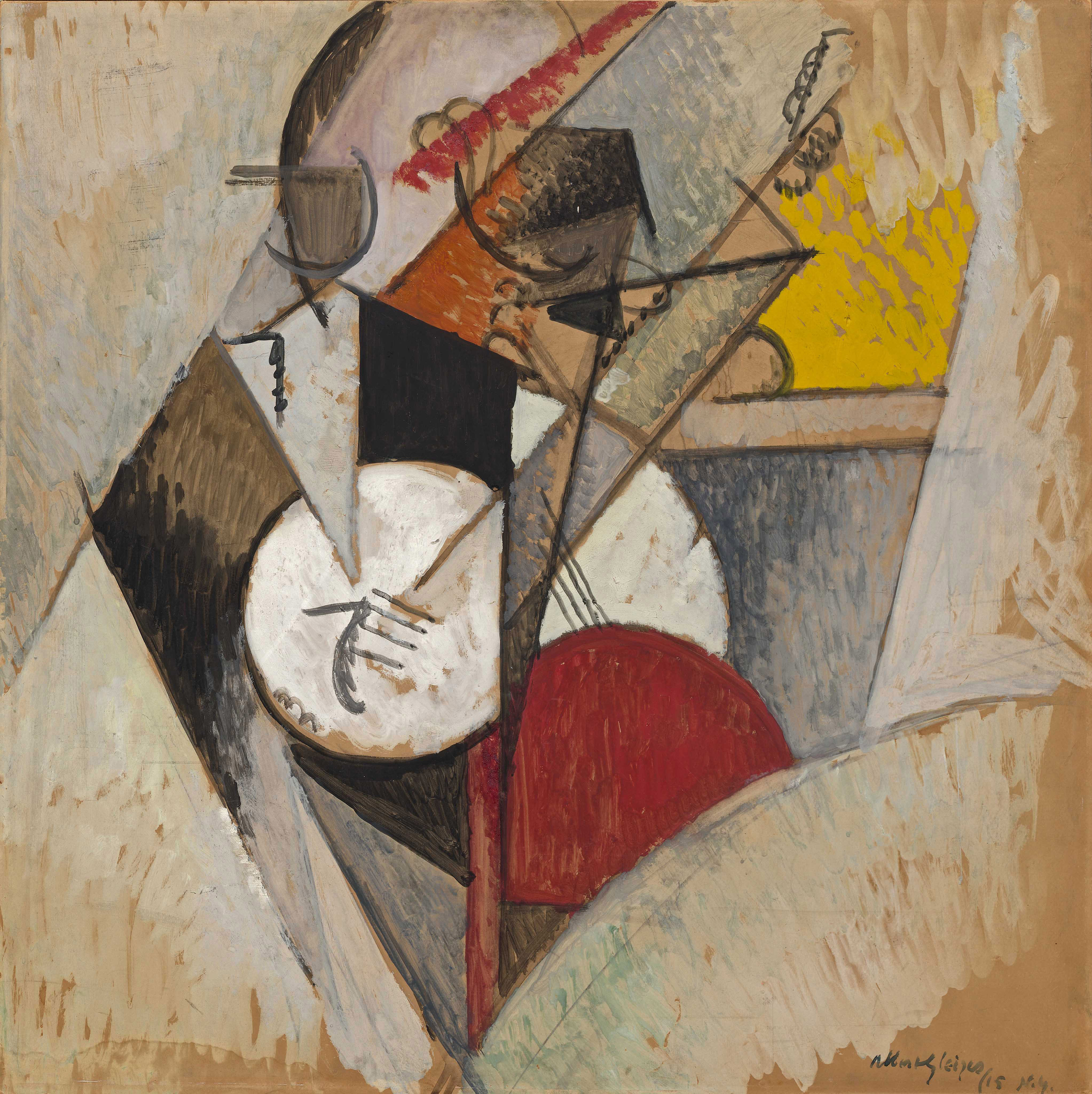
Albert Gleizes, 1915, Composition for "Jazz", oil on cardboard, 73 x 73 cm, Solomon R. Guggenheim Museum, New York

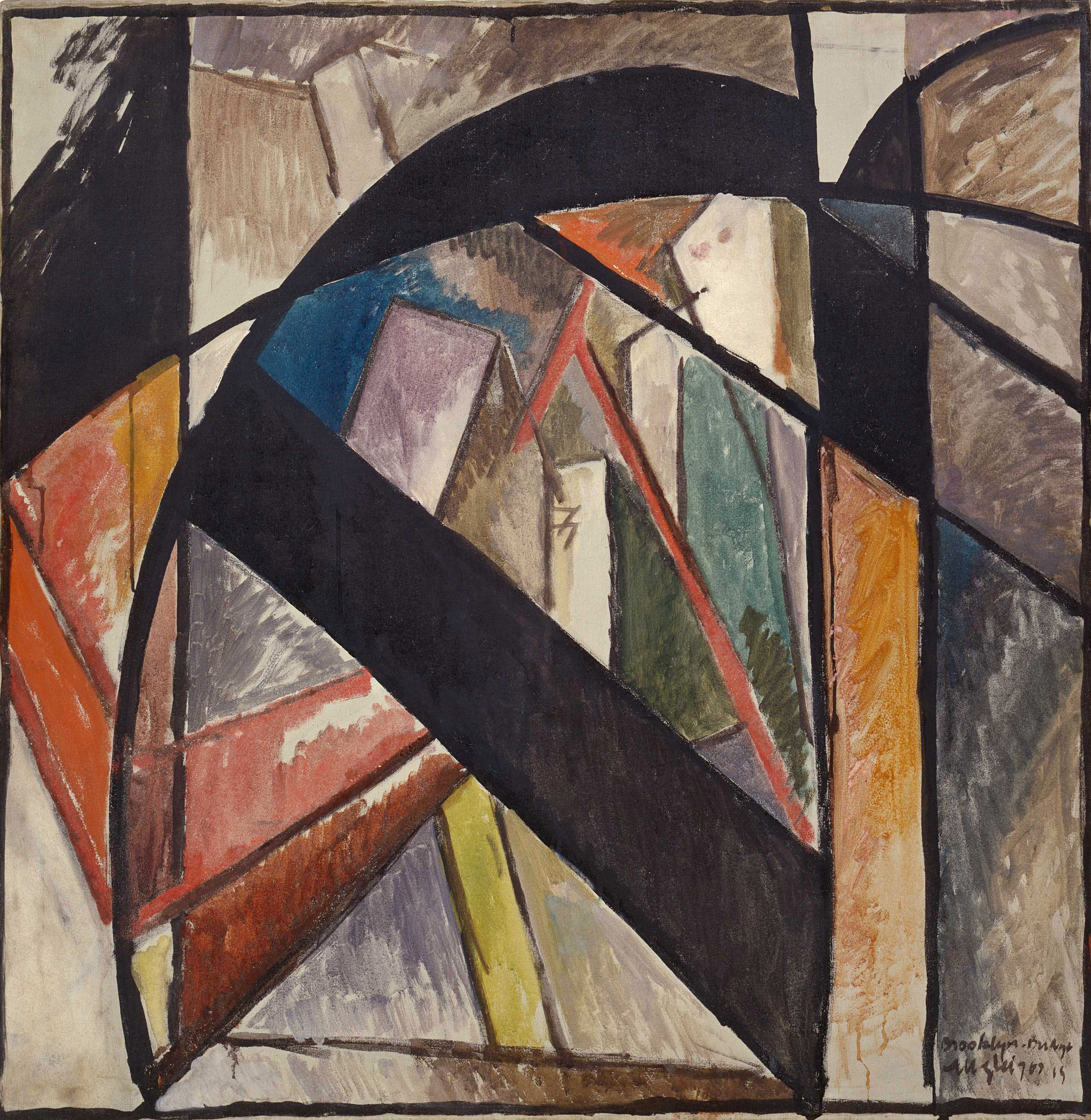
Albert Gleizes, 1915, Brooklyn Bridge (Pont de Brooklyn), oil and gouache on canvas, 102 x 102 cm, Solomon R. Guggenheim Museum, New York

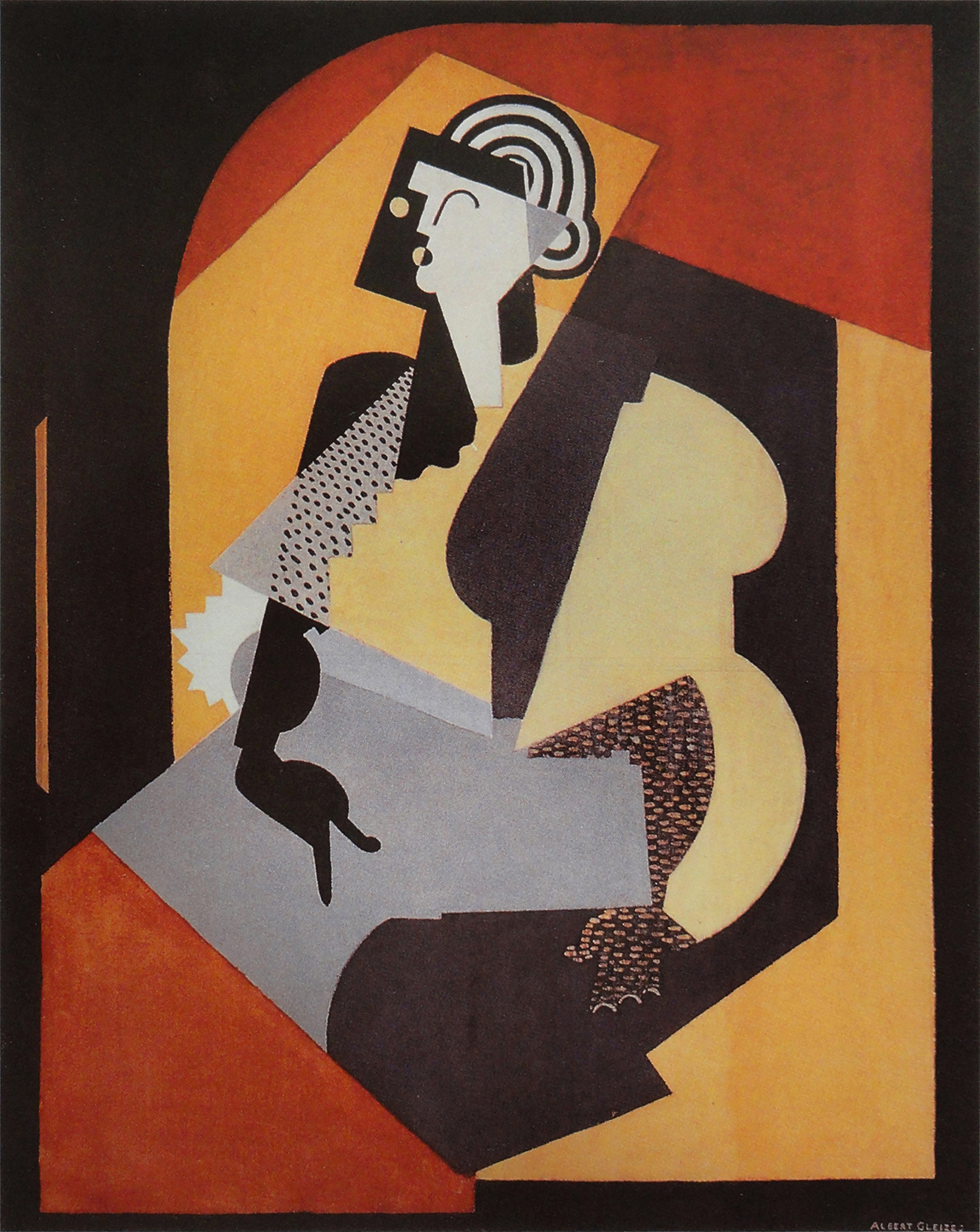
Albert Gleizes, 1920, Femme au gant noir (Woman with Black Glove), oil on canvas, 126 x 100 cm, National Gallery of Australia

In February 1913, Gleizes and other artists introduced the new style of European modern art to an American audience at the Armory Show (International Exhibition of Modern Art) in New York City, Chicago and Boston. In addition to Man on a balcony (l'Homme au Balcon) no. 196, Gleizes exhibited at the Armory Show his 1910 Femme aux Phlox (Woman with Phlox), Museum of Fine Arts, Houston.

Gleizes published an article in Ricciotto Canudo's Montjoie! entitled "Cubisme et la tradition". It was through the intermediary of Canudo that Gleizes would meet the artist Juliette Roche; a childhood friend of Jean Cocteau and daughter of Jules Roche, an influential politician of the 3rd Republic.

With the outbreak of World War I, Albert Gleizes re-enlisted in the French army. He was put in charge of organizing entertainment for the troops and as a result was approached by Jean Cocteau to design the set and costumes for the William Shakespeare play, A Midsummer Night's Dream, along with Georges Valmier.

Discharged from the military in the fall of 1915, Gleizes and his new wife, Juliette Roche, moved to New York, where they would meet regularly with Francis Picabia, Man Ray, Marcel Duchamp and Jean Crotti (who would eventually marry Suzanne Duchamp). It is at this time that Gleizes witnessed, with a critical eye, the readymades of Marcel Duchamp. After a short stay at the Albemarle Hotel Gleizes and his wife settled at 103 West Street, where Gleizes painted a series of works inspired by jazz music, skyscrapers, luminous signs and the Brooklyn Bridge. Here Gleizes met Stuart Davis, Max Weber, Joseph Stella, and participated in a show at Montross Gallery with Duchamp, Crotti and Metzinger (who remained in Paris)

From New York City, the couple sailed to Barcelona where they were joined by Marie Laurencin, Francis Picabia and his wife. The group spent the summer painting at the resort area of Tossa de Mar and in November Gleizes opened his first solo exhibition, at the Galeries Dalmau in Barcelona, 29 November – 12 December 1916. Returning to New York city in 1917, Gleizes began writing poetic sketches in verse and in prose, some of which were published in Picabia's Dada periodical 391. Both Gleizes and his wife traveled from New York to Bermuda in September 1917, where he painted a number of landscapes. When the war in Europe ended they returned to France where his career evolved more towards teaching through writing and he became involved with the committee of the Unions Intellectuelles Françaises.

During the winter of 1918 at the Gleizes' rented house in Pelham New York, writes Daniel Robbins, Albert Gleizes came to his wife and said, "A terrible thing has happened to me: I believe I am finding God." This new religious conviction resulted not from any mystical visions but instead from Gleizes' rational confrontation of three urgent problems: collective order, individual differences and the painter's role. Although Gleizes did not join the Church until 1941, his next twenty-five years were spent in a logical effort not only to find God but also to have faith.

From 1914 and extending to the end of the New York period, Gleizes' nonrepresentational paintings and those with an apparent visual basis existed side by side, differing only, writes Daniel Robbins, in "the degree of abstraction hidden by the uniformity with which they were painted and by the constant effort to tie the plastic realization of the painting to a specific, even unique, experience." Gleizes approached abstraction conceptually rather than visually and in 1924 his intricate dialectic caused him to produce two amusing paintings which departed from his usual subject matter: the Imaginary Still Lifes, Blue and Green. In effect, writes Robbins, "Gleizes would have inverted Courbet's "Show me an angel and I will paint you an angel" to be "As long as an angel remains an unembodied ideal and cannot be shown to me, I'll paint it."

== Interwar period ==
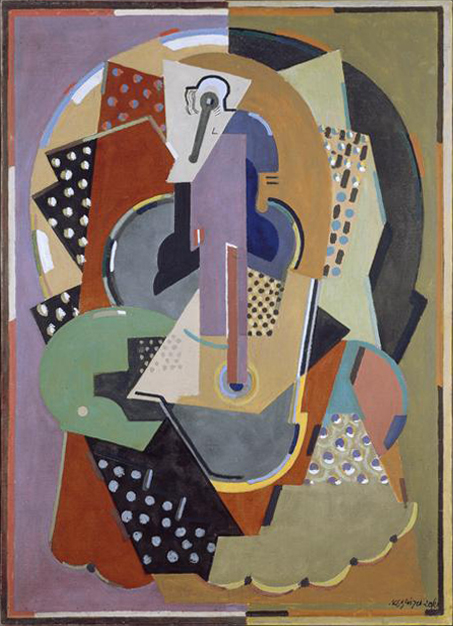
Albert Gleizes, 1920–23, Ecuyère (Horsewoman), oil on canvas, 130 x 93 cm, Musée des Beaux-Arts de Rouen. (Purchased from the artist in 1951. Dépôt du Centre Pompidou, 1998). This 1920 painting was reworked in 1923

By 1919 the pre-war sense of the Cubist movement had been virtually shattered. Paris was overshadowed by a strong reaction against those visions of common effort and revolutionary construction which Gleizes continued to embrace, while the avant-garde was characterized by the anarchic and, to him, destructive spirit of Dada. Neither alternative held any appeal for him and, with the Salons dominated by a return to classicism, his old hostility to Paris was constantly nourished. Gleizes' attempt to resuscitate the spirit of the Section d'Or was met with great difficulty, despite support by Alexander Archipenko, Georges Braque and Léopold Survage. His own organizational efforts were directed towards the re-establishment of a European-wide movement of abstract artists in the form of a large travelling exhibition, the Exposition de la Section d’Or, in 1920; it was not the success he had hoped for. Cubism was passé for younger artists, although Gleizes, on the contrary, felt that only its preliminary phase had been investigated.

It was the revival of the Section d'Or which ensured that Cubism in general and Gleizes in particular would become Dada's preferred target. Similarly, an effort to organize an artists' cooperative received the support of Robert Delaunay, but of no other major artists. The polemic resulted in the publication of Du cubisme et des moyens de le comprendre by Albert Gleizes, followed in 1922 by Painting and its Laws (La Peinture et ses lois), within which appear the notion of translation and rotation that would ultimately characterize both the pictorial and theoretical aspects of Gleizes' art. His post-Cubist style of the twenties—flat, forthright, uncompromising—is virtually Blaise Pascal's "Spirit of Geometry."

Gleizes was in nearly every sense a maverick Cubist, perhaps the most unyielding of them all; both in his paintings and writings (which had a big impact on the image of Cubism in Europe and the United States). He developed a single-minded, thoroughly uncompromising Cubism without the diversion of a classical alternative. During the 1920s Gleizes worked on a highly abstract brand of Cubism. In addition to his shows at Léonce Rosenberg's L'Effort Moderne, the dealer-publisher Povolozky printed his writings. His art was indeed backed by a prodigious theoretical effluence, most notably in La Peinture et ses lois (first published in La Vie des Lettres, October 1922). Gleizes fused aesthetic, metaphysical, moral and social priorities to describe the status and function of art.

=== Painting and its Laws ===
In La Peinture et ses lois writes Robbins, "Gleizes deduced the rules of painting from the picture plane, its proportions, the movement of the human eye and the laws of the universe. This theory, later referred to as translation-rotation, ranks with the writings of Mondrian and Malevich as one of the most thorough expositions of the principles of abstract art, which in his case entailed the rejection not only of representation but also of geometric forms." Flat planes were set in motion simultaneously to evoke space by shifting across one another, as if rotating and tilting on oblique axes. Diagrams entitled "Simultaneous movements of rotation and shifting of the plane on its axis" were published to illustrate the concept.

Gleizes undertook the task of writing the characterizations of these principles in Painting and its Laws (La Peinture et ses lois), published by gallery owner Jacques Povolozky in the journal La Vie des lettres et des arts, 1922–23, as a book in 1924, and reproduced in Léonce Rosenberg's Bulletin de l'Effort moderne, no. 13, March 1925, no. 14, April 1925.

One of Gleizes's primary objectives was to answer the questions: How will the planar surface be animated, and by what logical method, independent of the artists fantaisie, can it be attained?

The approach:
Gleizes bases these laws both on truisms inherent throughout the history of art, and especially on his own experience since 1912, such as: The primary goal of art has never been exterior imitation (p. 31); Artworks come from emotion... the product of individual sensibility and taste (p. 42); The artist is always in a state of emotion, sentimental exaltation [ivresse] (p. 43); The painting in which the idea of abstract creation is realized is no longer an anecdote, but a concrete fact (p. 56); Creating a painted artwork is not the emission of an opinion (p. 59); The plastic dynamism will be born out of rhythmic relations between objects... establishing novel plastic liaisons between purely objective elements that compose the painting (p. 22).

Continuing, Gleizes states that the 'reality' of a painting is not that of a mirror, but of the object... issue of imminent logic (p. 62). 'The subject-pretext tending toward numeration, inscribed following the nature of the plane, attains a tangent intersections between known images of the natural world and unknown images that reside within intuition' (p. 63).

Defining the laws:
Rhythm and space are for Gleizes the two vital conditions. Rhythm is a consequence of the continuity of certain phenomena, variable or invariable, following from mathematical relations. Space is a conception of the human psyche that follows from quantitative comparisons (pp. 35, 38, 51). This mechanism is the foundation for artistic expression. It is therefore both a philosophical and scientific synthesis. For Gleizes, Cubism was a means to arrive not only at a new mode of expression but above all a new way of thinking. This was, according to art historian Pierre Alibert, the foundation of both a new species of painting and an alternative relationship with the world; hence another principle of civilization.

The problem set out by Gleizes was to replace anecdote as a starting point for the work of art, by the sole means of using the elements of the painting itself: line, form and color.

Beginning with a central rectangle, taken as an example of elementary form, Gleizes points out two mechanical ways of juxtaposing form to create a painting: (1) either by reproducing the initial form (employing various symmetries such as reflectional, rotational or translational), or by modifying (or not) its dimensions. (2) By displacement of the initial form; pivoting around an imaginary axis in one direction or another.

The choice of position (through translation and/or rotation), though based on the inspiration of the artist, is no longer attributed to the anecdotal. An objective and rigorous method, independent of the painter, replaces emotion or sensibility in the determination the placement of form, that is through translation and rotation.

Schematic illustrations:

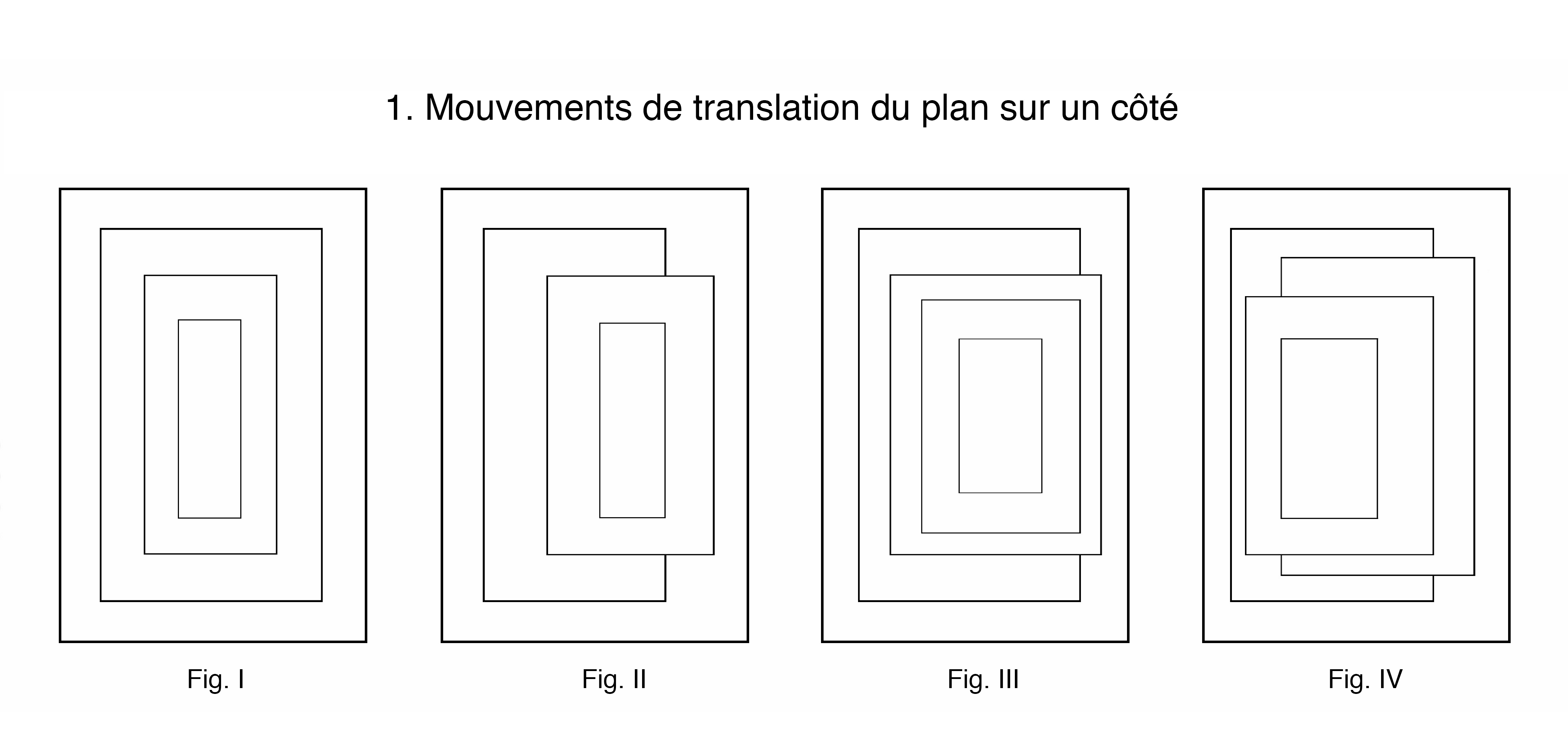
1. Movements of translation of the plane to one side

Space and rhythm, according to Gleizes, are perceptible by the extent of movement (displacement) of planar surfaces. These elemental transformations modify the position and importance of the initial plane, whether they converge or diverge ('recede' or 'advance') from the eye, creating a series of new and separate spatial planes appreciable physiologically by the observer.

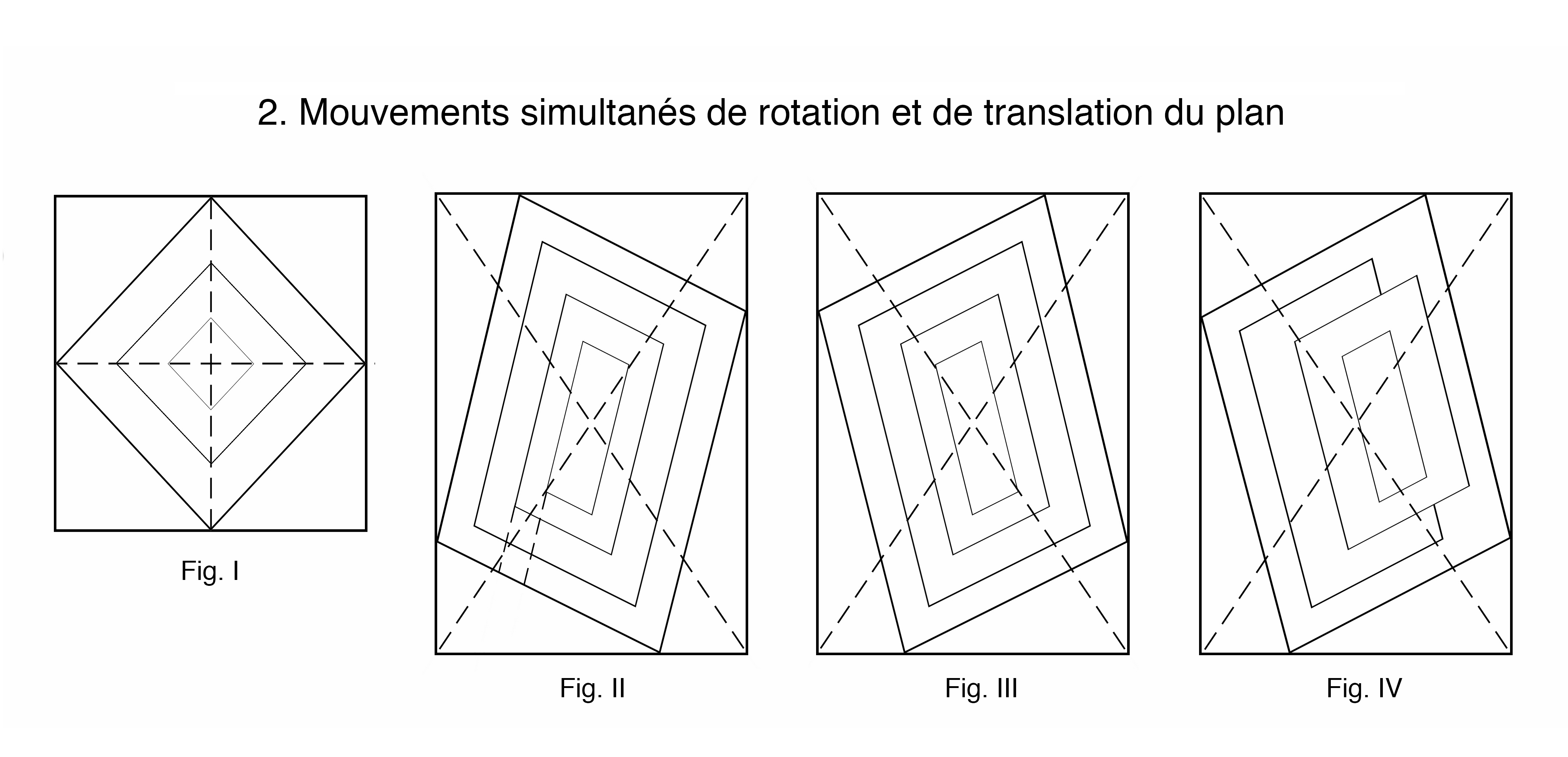
2. Simultaneous movements of rotation and translation of the plane

Another movement is added to the first movement of translation of the plane to one side: Rotation of the plane. Fig. I shows the resulting formation that follows from simultaneous movements of rotation and translation of the initial plane produced on the axis. Fig II and Fig. III represent the simultaneous movements of rotation and translation of the rectangle, inclined to the right and to the left. The axis point at which movement is realized is established by the observer. Fig. IV represents the simultaneous movements of rotation and translation of the rectangle plane, with the position of the eye of the observed displaced left of the axis. Displacement toward the right (though not represented) is straightforward enough to imagine.

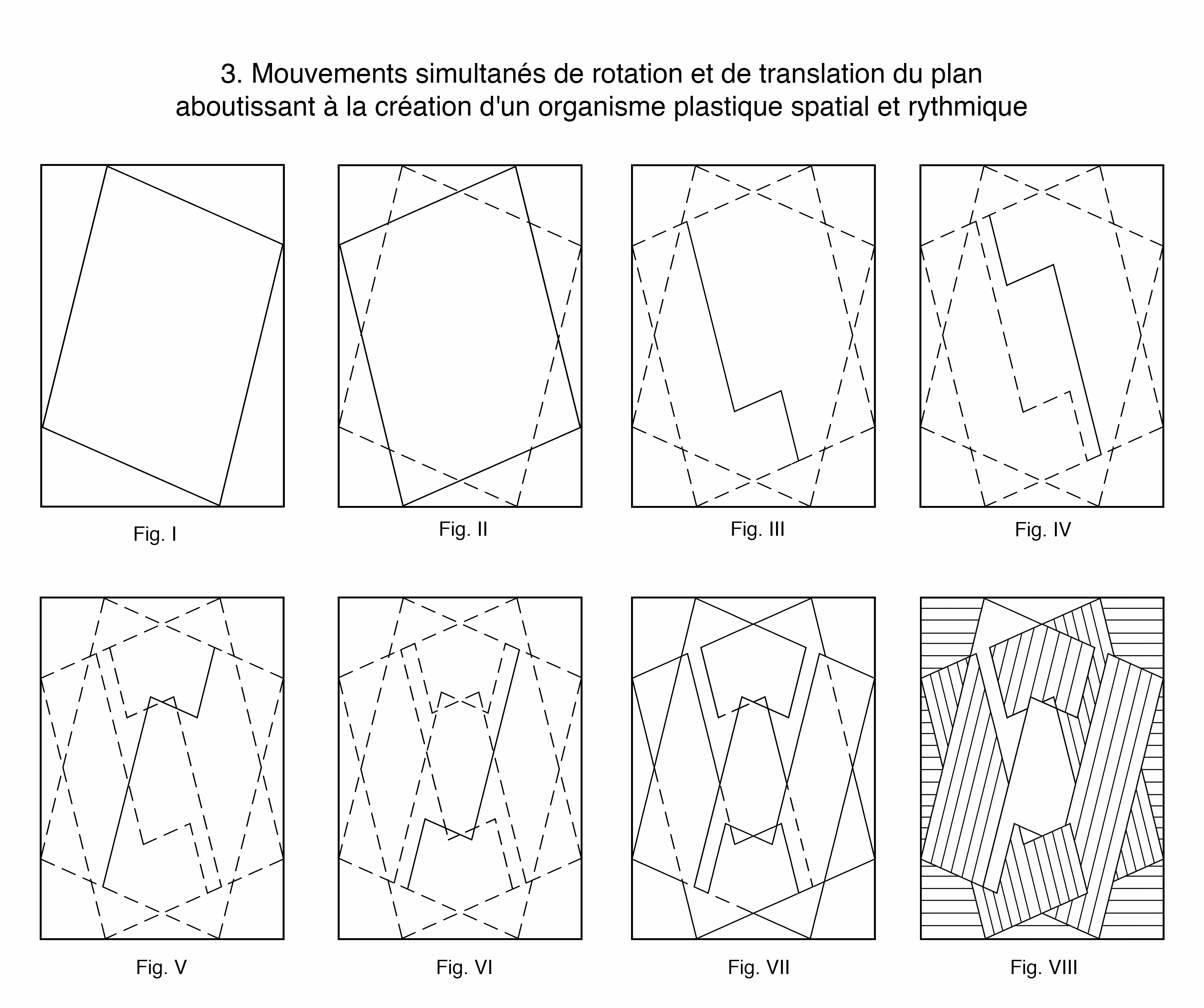
3. Simultaneous movements of rotation and translation of the plane resulting in the creation of a spatial and rhythmic plastic organism

With these figures Gleizes attempts to present, under the most simple conditions possible (simultaneous movements of rotation and translation of the plane), the creation of a spatial and rhythmic organism (Fig. VIII), with practically no initiative taken on the part of the artist who controls the evolutionary process. The planar surfaces of Fig. VIII are filled with hatching espousing the 'direction' of the planes. What emerges in the inert plane, according to Gleizes, through the movement followed by the eye of the observer, is "a visible imprint of successive stages of which the initial rhythmic cadence coordinated a succession of differing states". These successive stages permit the perception of space. The initial state, by consequence of the transformation, has become a spatial and rhythmic organism.

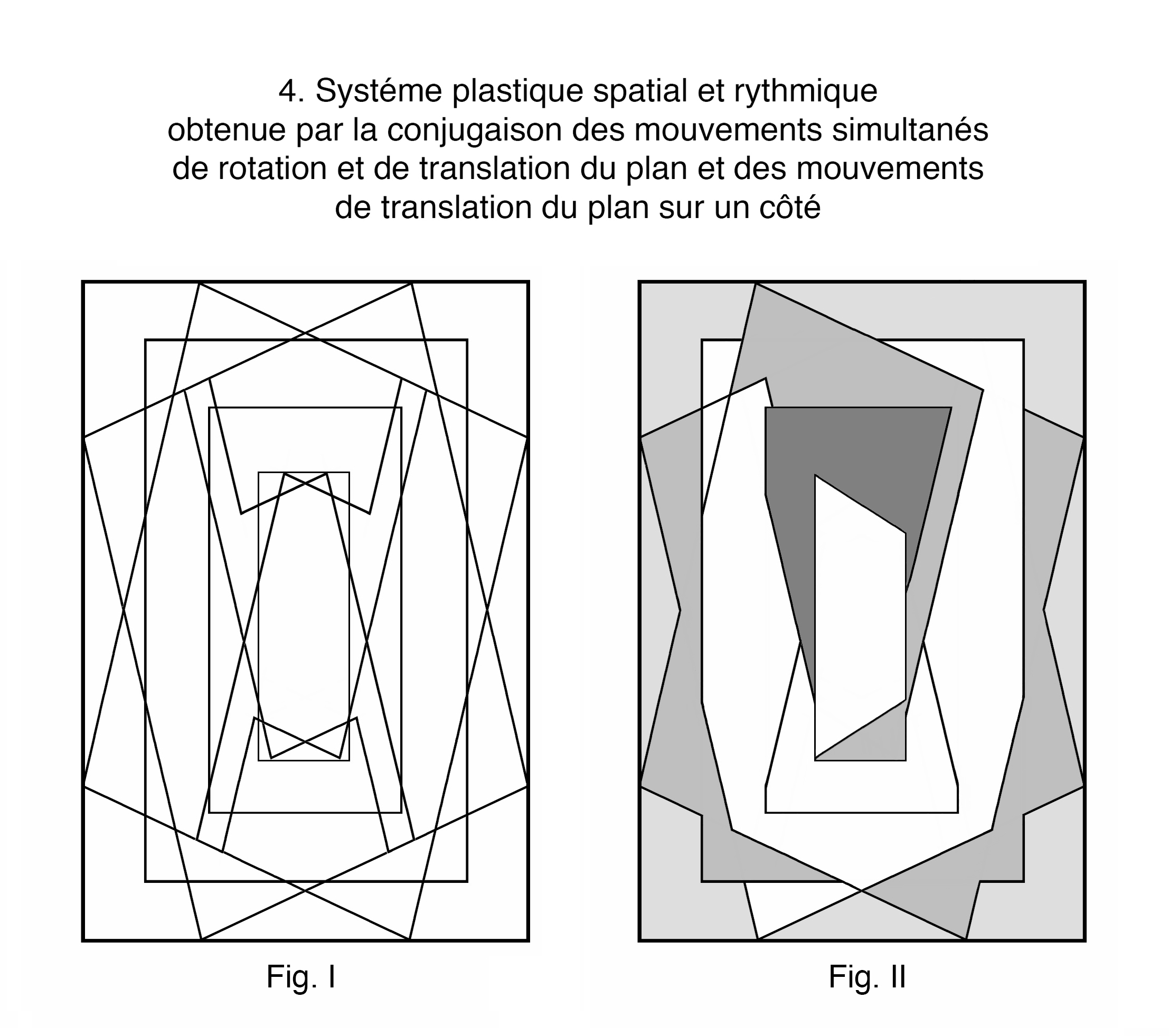
4. Plastic spatial and rhythmic system obtained by the conjugation of simultaneous movements of rotation and translation of the plane and from the movements of translation of the plane to one side

Fig. I and Fig. II obtain mechanically, Gleizes writes, with minimal personal initiative, a "plastic spatial and rhythmic system", by the conjugation of simultaneous movements of rotation and translation of the plane and from the movements of translation of the plane to one side. The result is a spatial and rhythmic organism more complex than shown in Fig. VIII; demonstrating through mechanical, purely plastic means, the realization of a material universe independent of intentional intervention by the artist. This is sufficient to demonstrate, according to Gleizes, the possibilities of the plane to serve spatially and rhythmically by its own power. [L'exposé hâtif de cette mécanique purement plastique aboutissant à la réalisation d'un univers matériel en dehors de l'intervention particulière intentionnelle, suffit à démontrer la possibilité du plan de signifier spatialement et rythmiquement par sa seule puissance].

Gleizes' painting of 1920–1922, submitted to the same rigor, were not Cubist in any conventional sense; but they were Cubist in their concern with planimetric space, and in their relationship (synthesis) with subject-matter. Indeed, the abstract appearance of these compositions is misleading. Gleizes had always remained committed to synthesis. He described how artists had freed themselves from the 'subject-image' as a pretext to work from the 'subjectless-image' (nebulous forms) until they came together. The images known from the natural world combined with those nebulous forms were made 'spiritually human'. Though Gleizes considered his works as initially nonrepresentational and only afterwards as denotational.

Before World War I, Gleizes had always been identified as a Cubist avant-garde. And during the twenties he continued to hold a prominent position, but he was no longer identified with the avant-garde since Cubism had been superseded by Dada and Surrealism. Even after historians began their attempts to analyze the vital role played by Cubism, the name of Albert Gleizes was always mentioned because of his early and important participation in the movement. Gleizes had never ceased to call himself a Cubist and theoretically a Cubist he remained. In many ways his theories were close to those developed by Mondrian, though his paintings never submitted to the discipline of primary colors and the right angle; they were not Neo-Plastic (or De Stijl) in character. In fact, his works from the late 1920s through the 1940s looked like nothing else that was being done, and indeed, they were rarely seen in the art world because Gleizes deliberately distanced himself from extensive participation in the Parisian scene.

Gleizes realized that his evolution towards 'purity' carried with it the risk of alienation from the 'mentality of the milieu', but he saw it as the sole means of arriving at a new type of art that could reach a mass audience (just as the French murals of the 11th and 12th centuries). In Du Cubisme et les moyens de comprendre (1920), Gleizes went so far as to envisage the mass-production of painting; as a means of undermining the market system and thus the status of artworks as commodities. 'The multiplication of pictures,' Gleizes wrote, 'strikes at the heart of the understanding and the economic notions of the bourgeois.'

=== 1920s–1930s ===
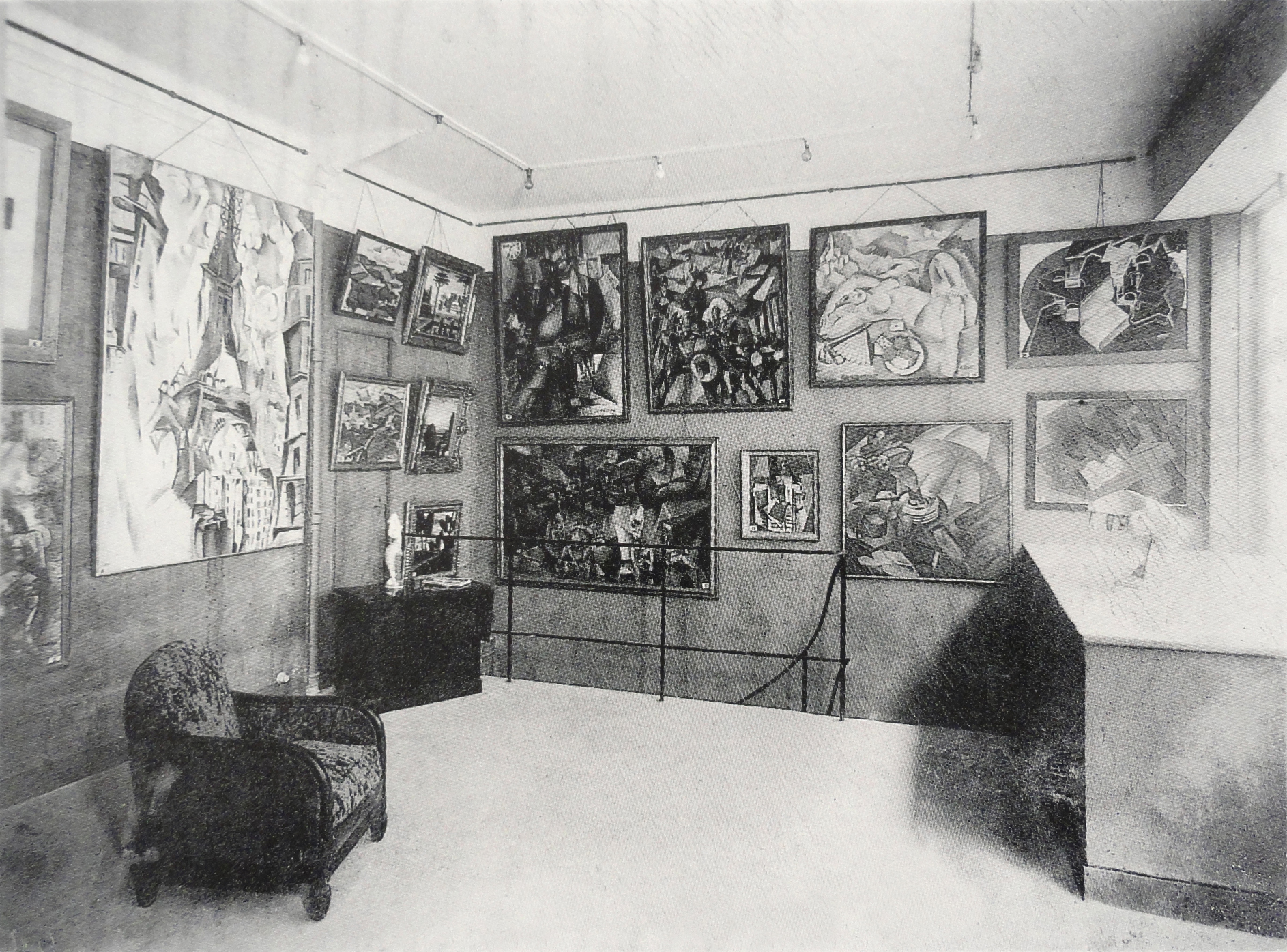
La Section d'Or exhibition, 1925, Galerie Vavin-Raspail, Paris. Albert Gleizes, Portrait de Eugène Figuière, La Chasse (The Hunt), and Les Baigneuses (The Bathers) are seen towards the center. Works by Robert Delaunay and André Lhote are seen to the left and right respectively, amidst works by others

After World War I, with the support given by the dealer Léonce Rosenberg, Cubism returned as a central issue for artists. With the Salons dominated by a return to classicism, Gleizes attempted to resuscitate the spirit of the Section d'Or in 1920 but was met with great difficulty, despite support by Fernand Léger, Alexander Archipenko, Georges Braque, Constantin Brâncuși, Henri Laurens, Jacques Villon, Raymond Duchamp-Villon, Louis Marcoussis and Léopold Survage. Gleizes' organizational efforts were directed towards the establishment of a European-wide movement of Cubist and abstract art in the form of a large traveling exhibition; the Exposition de la Section d’Or. The idea was to bring together a collection of works that revealed the complete process of transformation and renewal that had taken place. It was not the success he had hoped for. Cubism was seen as passé for emerging artists and other established artists such as Marcel Duchamp and Picabia, although Gleizes, on the contrary, felt that only its preliminary phase had been investigated.

In addition to Cubists works (which already represented a wide variety of styles), the second edition of the Section d'Or held at the Galerie La Boétie from 5 March 1920 included De Stijl, Bauhaus, Constructivism and Futurism. It was the revival of the Section d'Or which ensured that Cubism in general would become Dada's preferred target. The new polemic resulted in the publication of Du cubisme et des moyens de le comprendre by Gleizes, followed in 1922 by La Peinture et ses lois.

Following the death of Jules Roche, the Gleizes' had enough independent income and real estate to pursue their goals without bowing to material considerations, unlike many other artists. The Gleizes' spent more and more time at the family home in Serrières, in Cavalaire, and an even quieter location on the French Riviera, both associating with people more sympathetic to their social ideas. Gleizes became active in the Union Intellectuelle and lectured extensively in France, Germany, Poland and England, while continuing to write. In 1924–25 the Bauhaus (where certain ideals analogous to his own were practiced) requested a new book on Cubism (as part of a series which included Wassily Kandinsky's Point and Line to Plane, Paul Klee's Pedagogical Notebooks, and Kasimir Malevich's The Non-Objective World). Gleizes, in response, would write Kubismus (published in 1928) for the collection of Bauhausbücher 13, Munich. The publication of Kubismus in French the following year would bring Gleizes closer to Delaunay. In 1924 Gleizes, Léger and Amédée Ozenfant opened Académie Moderne.

In 1927, still dreaming of the communal days at the Abbaye de Créteil, Gleizes founded an artist's colony at a rented house called the Moly-Sabata in Sablons near his wife's family home in Serrières in the Ardèche département in the Rhône Valley.

Léonce Rosenberg, in 1929, commissioned Gleizes (replacing Gino Severini) to paint decorative panels for his Parisian residence, which would be installed in 1931. The same year Gleizes was part of the committee of Abstraction-Création (founded by Theo van Doesburg, Auguste Herbin, Jean Hélion and Georges Vantongerloo) that acted as a forum for international non-representational art, and counteracted the influence of the Surrealist group led by André Breton. By this time, his work reflected the strengthening of his religious convictions and his 1932 book, Vers une conscience plastique, La Forme et l’histoire examines Celtic, Romanesque, and Oriental art. On tour in Poland and Germany, he gave lectures titled Art et Religion, Art et Production and Art et Science and wrote a book on Robert Delaunay but it was never published.

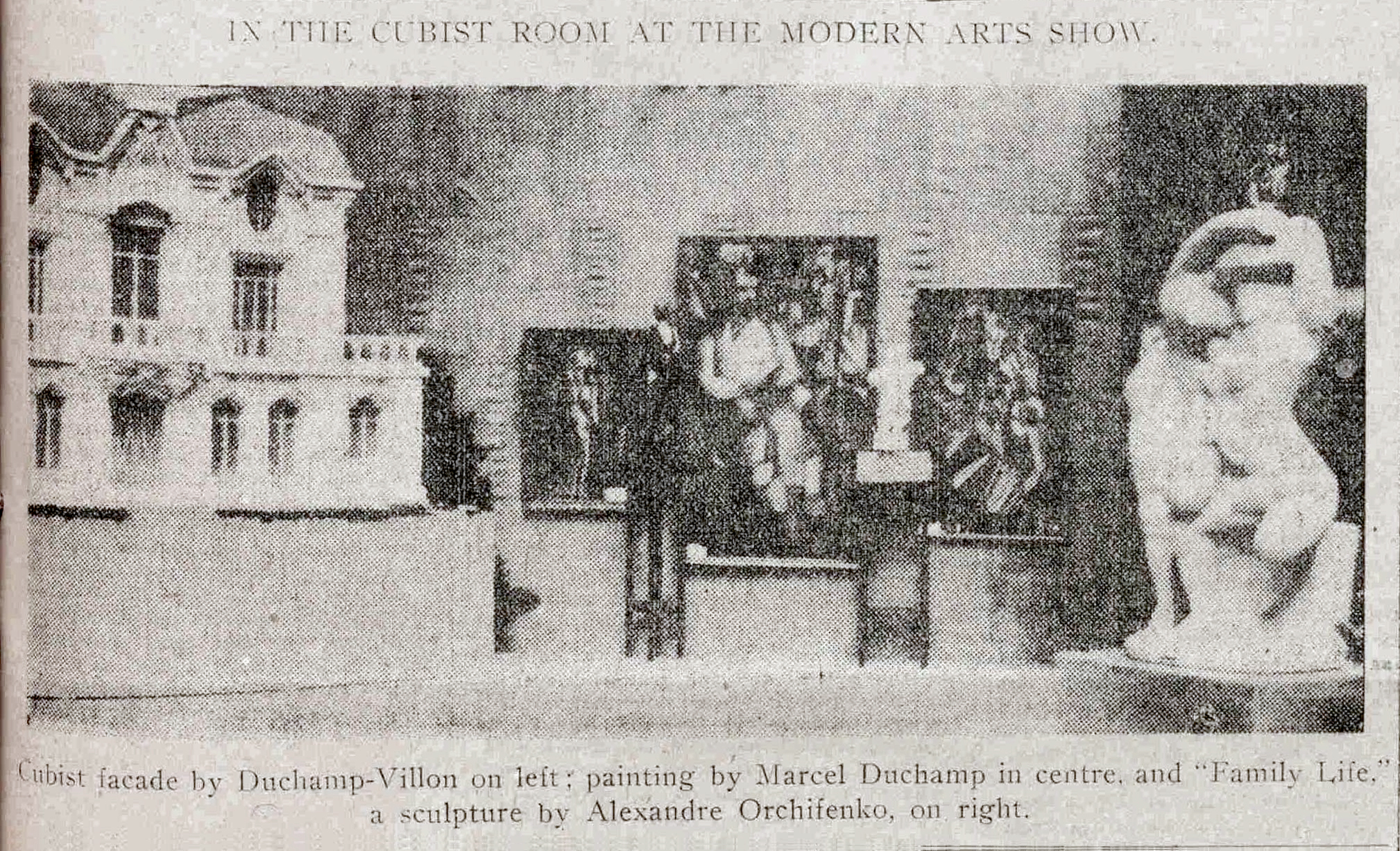
Installation shot of the Cubist room, 1913 Armory Show, published in the New York Tribune, February 17, 1913 (p. 7). Left to right: Raymond Duchamp-Villon, La Maison Cubiste (Projet d'Hotel), Cubist House; Marcel Duchamp Nude (Study), Sad Young Man on a Train (Nu [esquisse], jeune homme triste dans un train) 1911-12 (The Solomon R. Guggenheim Foundation, Peggy Guggenheim Collection, Venice); Albert Gleizes, L'Homme au Balcon (Man on a Balcony), 1912 (Philadelphia Museum of Art); Marcel Duchamp, Nude Descending a Staircase, No. 2; Alexander Archipenko, La Vie Familiale, Family Life (destroyed)

In 1934 Gleizes began a series of paintings that would continue for several years, in which three levels are identified: static translation, corresponding to his researches of the 1920s; mobile rotation, corresponding to his researches into coloured cadences of the late 1920s and early 1930s; and simple grey arcs which, Gleizes argues, gives the 'form' or unifying 'rhythm' of the painting. The level of 'translation' is generally a geometrical figure evoking a representational image, unlike the work of the early 1930s. These works no longer articulate the strict non-representation of Abstraction Création. Léonce Rosenberg—who had already published Gleizes extensively in his Bulletin de l'Effort Moderne, but had not previously shown much enthusiasm for his painting—was deeply impressed by Gleizes' paintings (which followed from his 1934 research) at the Salon d'Automne. This was the beginning of a close relationship with Gleizes, which continued through the 1930s and is reflected in a stream of correspondence.

In 1937, Gleizes was commissioned to paint murals for the Exposition Internationale des Arts et Techniques dans la Vie Moderne at the Paris World's Fair. He collaborated with the Delaunays in the Pavillon de l'Air and with Léopold Survage and Fernand Léger for the Pavillon de l'Union des Artistes Modernes. At the end of 1938, Gleizes volunteered to participate in the free seminars and discussion groups for young painters set up by Robert Delaunay at his Paris studio. Then Gleizes, in collaboration with Jacques Villon, conceived the idea of executing a mural for the auditorium of the École des Arts et Métiers; the latter was rejected by the school authorities as too abstract, but immense panels by Gleizes survive as Four Legendary Figures of the Sky (San Antonio, TX, McNay A. Inst.). Other examples of this ambitious public style include The Transfiguration (1939–41; Lyon, Mus. B.-A.).

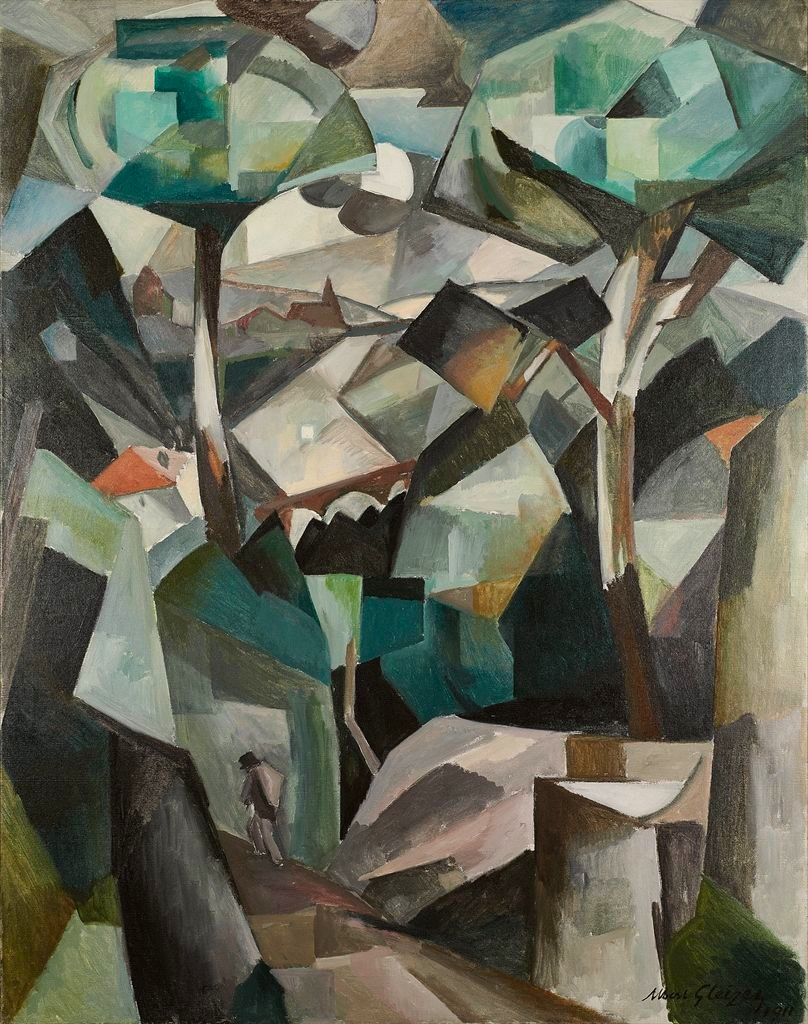
Albert Gleizes, 1911, Le Chemin, Paysage à Meudon, oil on canvas, 146.4 x 114.4 cm. Exhibited at Salon des Indépendants, 1911, Salon des Indépendants, Bruxelles, 1911, Galeries J. Dalmau, Barcelona, 1912, Galerie La Boétie, Salon de La Section d'Or, 1912, stolen by Nazi occupiers from the home of collector Alphonse Kann during World War II, returned to its rightful owners in 1997

In the late 1930s, the wealthy American art connoisseur Peggy Guggenheim purchased a great deal of the new art in Paris including works by Albert Gleizes. She brought these works to the United States which today form part of the Peggy Guggenheim Collection.

=== Religious Influence ===
Albert Gleizes did believe in the Roman catholic church and even considered himself a catholic dating back to the 1920s. Despite his admiration for the Western Christian tradition and the early medieval church, Gleizes did not join the Roman Catholic Church until 1941. Gleizes believed that the church had lost its "spirit" since the rise of scholastic philosophy and representational art in the thirteenth century. However, in 1941, he soon came to believe that the sacraments were still true and effective, despite some intellectual deviations. In 1942, he was formally confirmed into the Roman Catholic Church and received his First Communion. After joining the Church, Gleizes would write memoirs and series that talked about meditation such as "Supports de contemplation" and "Souvenirs: Le Cubisme" adding on Large Triptychs. A retrospective of Gleizes'artwork was held at the Chapelle du Lycée Ampère in Lyon in 1947, marking the end of his career. Gleizes' last creations include a set of 57 illustrations for Blaise Pascal's Pensées, and a fresco called The Eucharist which was located in a chapel at a new Jesuit seminary in the Fontaines community in Chantilly.

=== World War II and after ===
During World War II, Gleizes and his wife remained in France under the German occupation. In 1942 Gleizes began the series of Supports de Contemplation, large scale, entirely non-representational paintings that are both very complex and very serene. Materials being difficult to obtain during the war, Gleizes painted on burlap, sizing the porous material with a mixture of glue and paint. He had used burlap in some of his earliest paintings and now found it favorable to his vigorous touch, for it took the most powerful strokes even while preserving the matte surface he so valued. In 1952, Gleizes realized his last major work, a fresco titled Eucharist that he painted for a Jesuit chapel in Chantilly.

Albert Gleizes died in Avignon in the Vaucluse département on 23 June 1953 and was interred in his wife's family mausoleum in the cemetery at Serrières.

== Art market ==
In 2010, Le Chemin (Paysage à Meudon) (1911), oil on canvas, 146.4 x 114.4 cm, sold for 1,833,250 GBP ($2,683,878, or 2,198,983 Euros) at Christie's, London.

== Legacy ==
"Gleizes' individual development, his unique struggle to reconcile forces," writes Daniel Robbins, "made him one of the few painters to come out of Cubism with a wholly individual style, undeflected by later artistic movements. Although he occasionally returned to earlier subjects... these later works were treated anew, on the basis of fresh insights. He never repeated his earlier styles, never remained stationary, but always grew more intense, more passionate. [...] His life ended in 1953 but his paintings remain to testify to his willingness to struggle for final answers. His is an abstract art of deep significance and meaning, paradoxically human even in his very search for absolute order and truth." (Daniel Robbins, 1964)

== Commemoration ==
In celebration of the 100th anniversary of the publication of Du "Cubisme" by Albert Gleizes and Jean Metzinger, the Musée de La Poste in Paris presented a show entitled Gleizes – Metzinger. Du cubisme et après, from 9 May to 22 September 2012. Over 80 paintings and drawings, along with documents, films and 15 works by other members of the Section d'Or group (Villon, Duchamp-Villon, Kupka, Le Fauconnier, Lhote, La Fresnaye, Survage, Herbin, Marcoussis, Archipenko...) were included in the show. A catalogue in French and English was published for the event. A French postage stamp is issued representing works by Gleizes (Le Chant de Guerre, 1915) and Metzinger (L'Oiseau Bleu, 1913). This is the first time that a museum has organized an exhibit showcasing both Gleizes and Metzinger together.

== Gallery ==
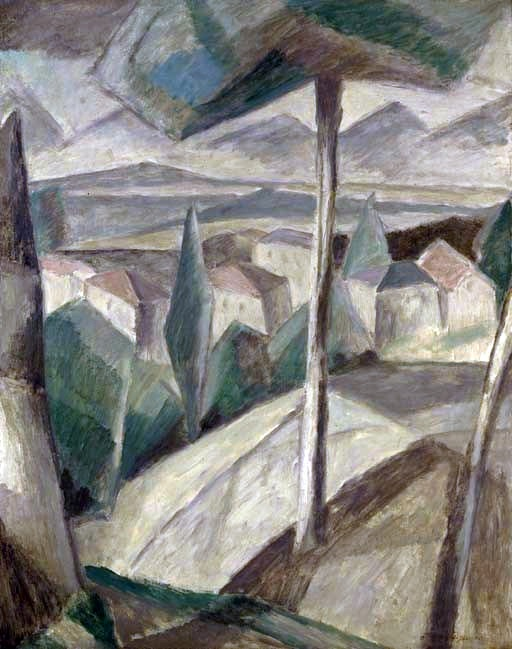
Albert Gleizes, 1910, L'Arbre (The Tree), oil on canvas, 92 x 73.2 cm, private collection. Exhibited Salon des Indépendants, 1910; Salon de la Section d'Or, Galerie La Boétie, 1912; Manes Moderni Umeni, S.V.U., Vystava, Prague, 1914

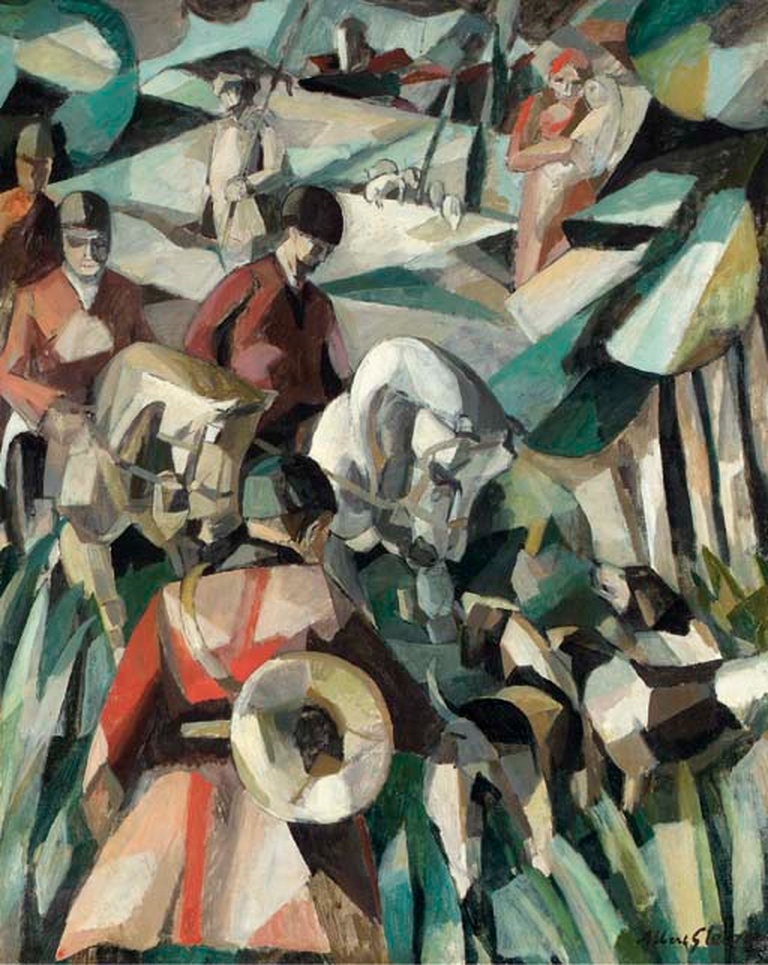
Albert Gleizes, 1911, La Chasse (The Hunt), oil on canvas, 123.2 x 99 cm. Published in L'Intransigeant, 10 October 1911, "Les Peintres Cubistes" 1913, by G. Apollinaire, and Au Salon d'Automne, Revue d'Europe et d'Amerique, Paris, October 1911

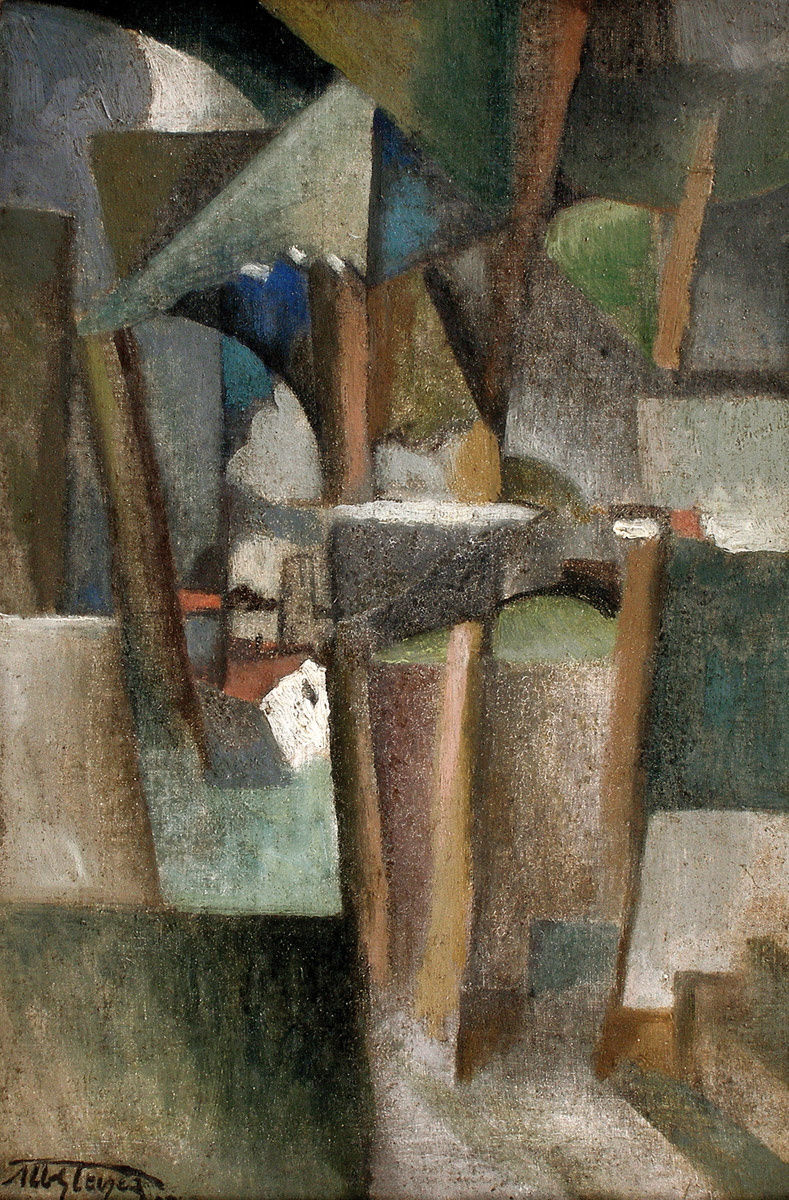
Albert Gleizes, 1910–12, Les Arbres (The Trees), oil on canvas, 41 x 27 cm. Reproduced in Du "Cubisme", 1912

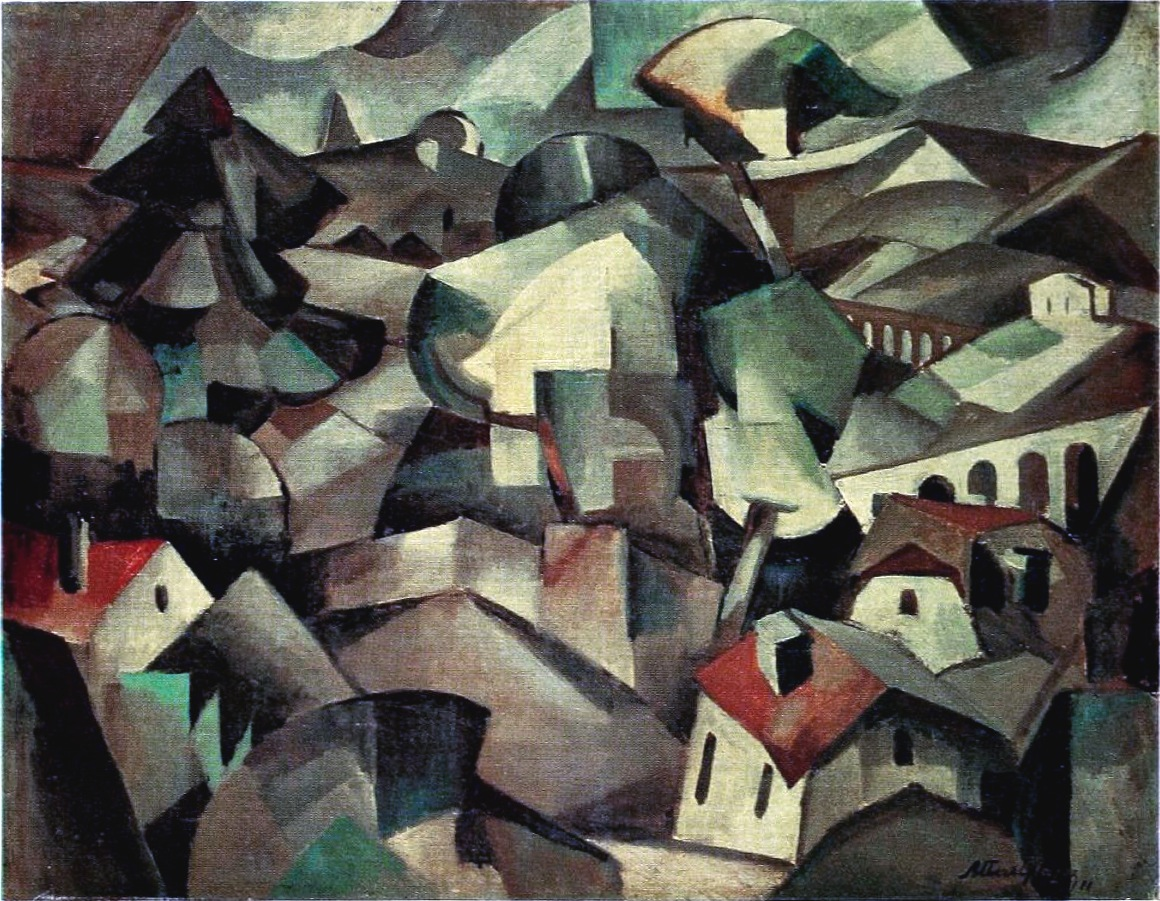
Albert Gleizes, 1911, Paysage (Landscape, Les Maison), oil on canvas, 71 x 91.5 cm. Reproduced frontispiece catalogue Galeries Dalmau, Barcelona, 1912

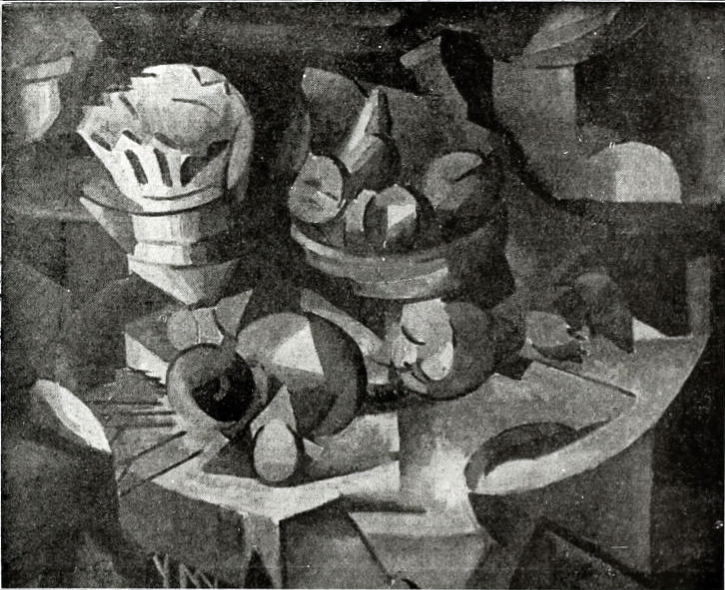
Albert Gleizes, 1911, Stilleben, Nature Morte, Der Sturm postcard, Sammlung Walden, Berlin. Collection Paul Citroen, sold 1928 to Kunstausstellung Der Sturm, requisition by the Nazis in 1937, and missing since

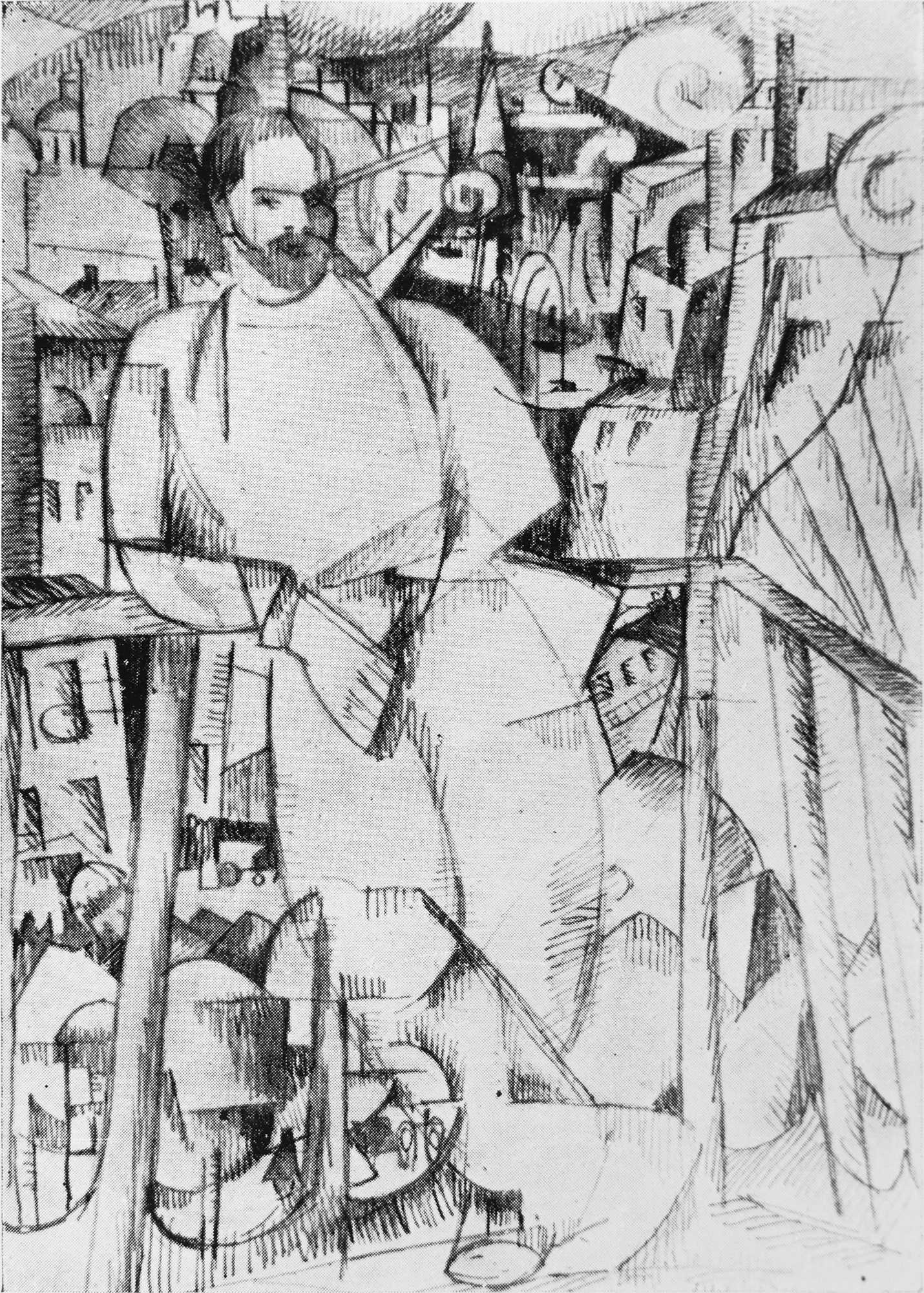
Albert Gleizes, 1912 (spring), Dessin pour L'Homme au balcon, exhibited Salon des Indépendants 1912

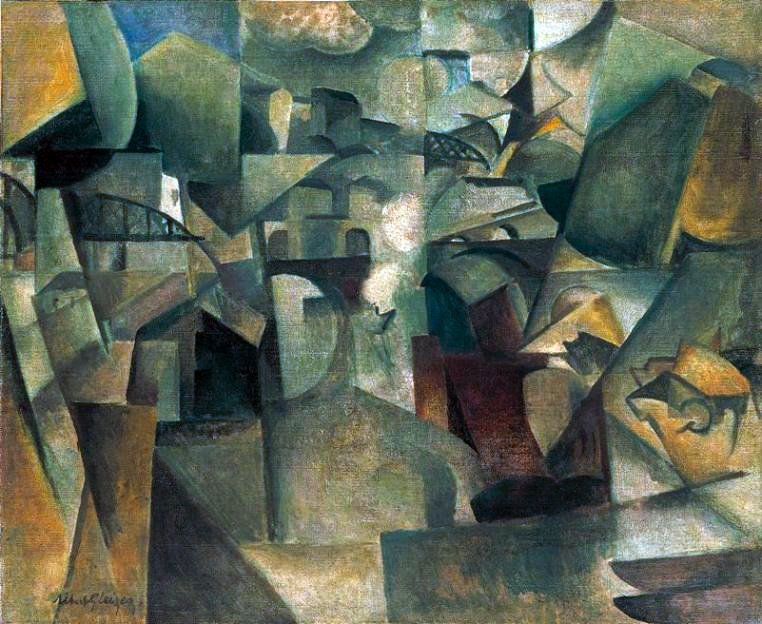
Albert Gleizes, 1912, Les ponts de Paris (Passy), The Bridges of Paris (Passy), oil on canvas, 60.5 x 73.2 cm, Museum Moderner Kunst (mumok), Vienna. Published in Du "Cubisme", 1912

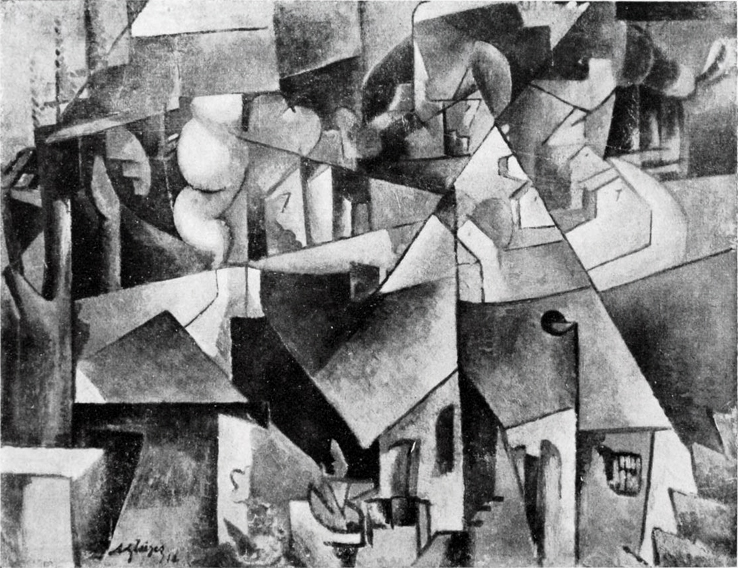
Albert Gleizes, 1912, Landschaft bei Paris, Paysage près de Paris, Paysage de Courbevoie, oil on canvas, 72.8 x 87.1 cm, missing from Hannover since 1937

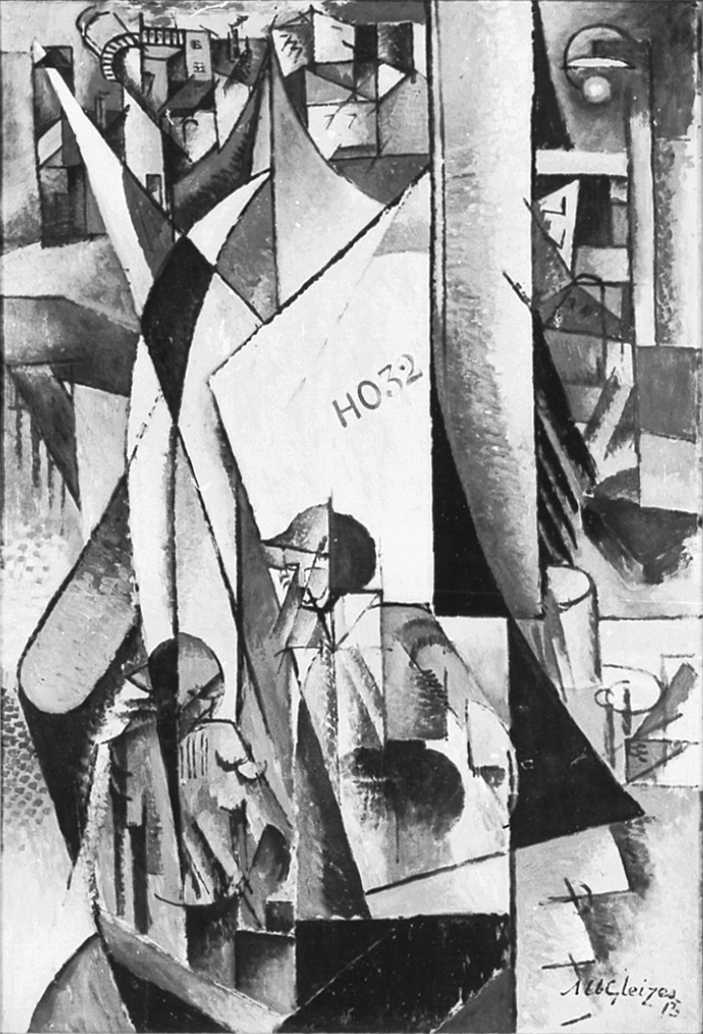
Albert Gleizes, 1913, Les Bateaux de pêche (Fischerboote), oil on canvas, 165 x 111 cm, exhibited Salon d'Automne, Paris, 1913–14, no. 770, Manes Moderni Umeni, Vystava, Prague, 1914, no. 44, Tel Aviv Museum of Art

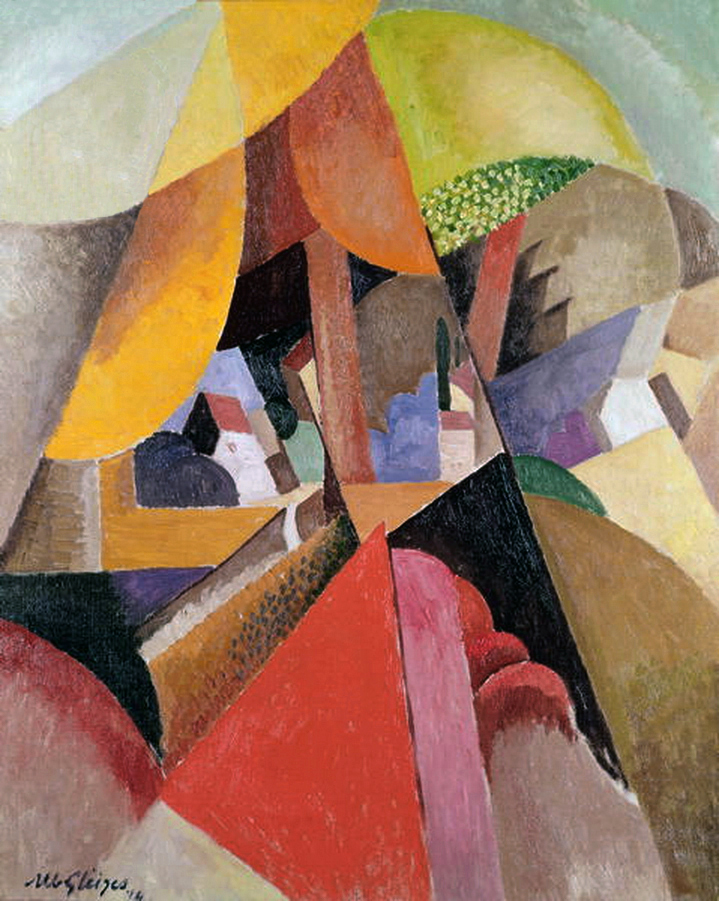
Albert Gleizes, 1914, Paysage avec un arbre (Landscape with Tree), oil on canvas, 100 x 81 cm, private collection

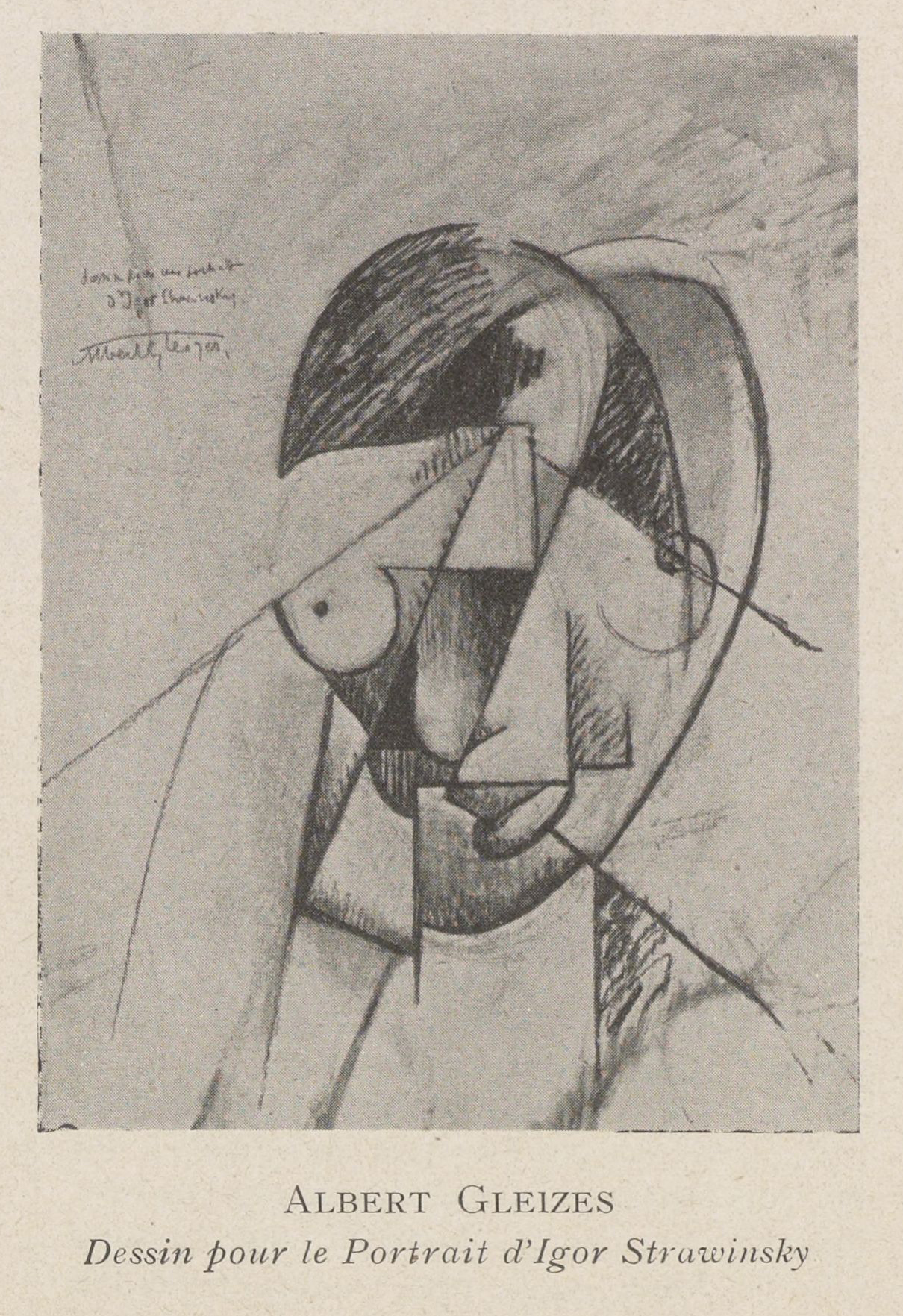
Albert Gleizes, c.1914, Dessin pour le Portrait de Stravinsky, published in Montjoie!, April–June 1914

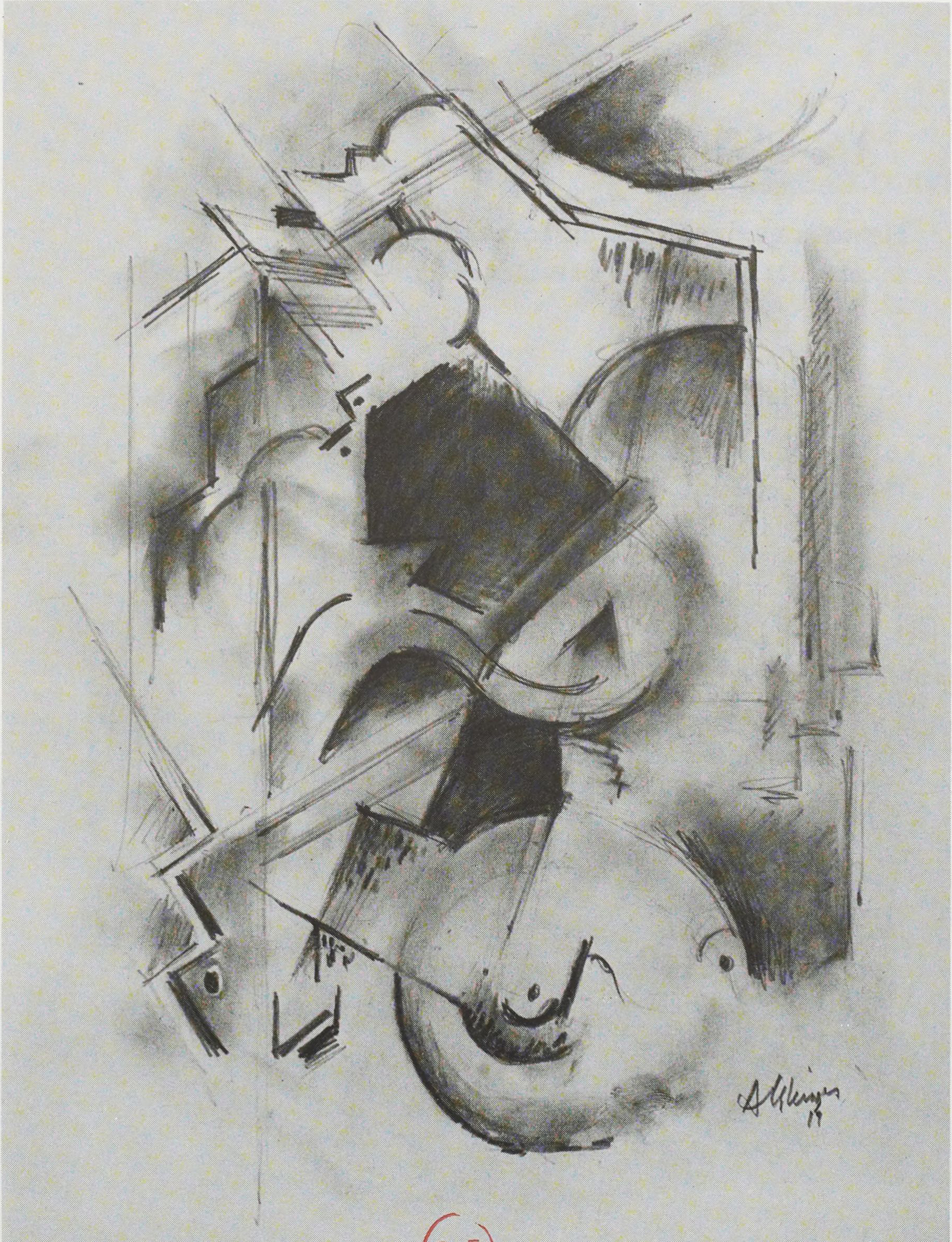
Albert Gleizes, 1914–15, Portrait de Florent Schmitt (Le Pianiste), pastel, 36 x 27 cm. This is a study for an oil on canvas titled Portrait de Florent Schmitt, 1914–15, 200 cm × 152 cm (78.5 in × 60 in)

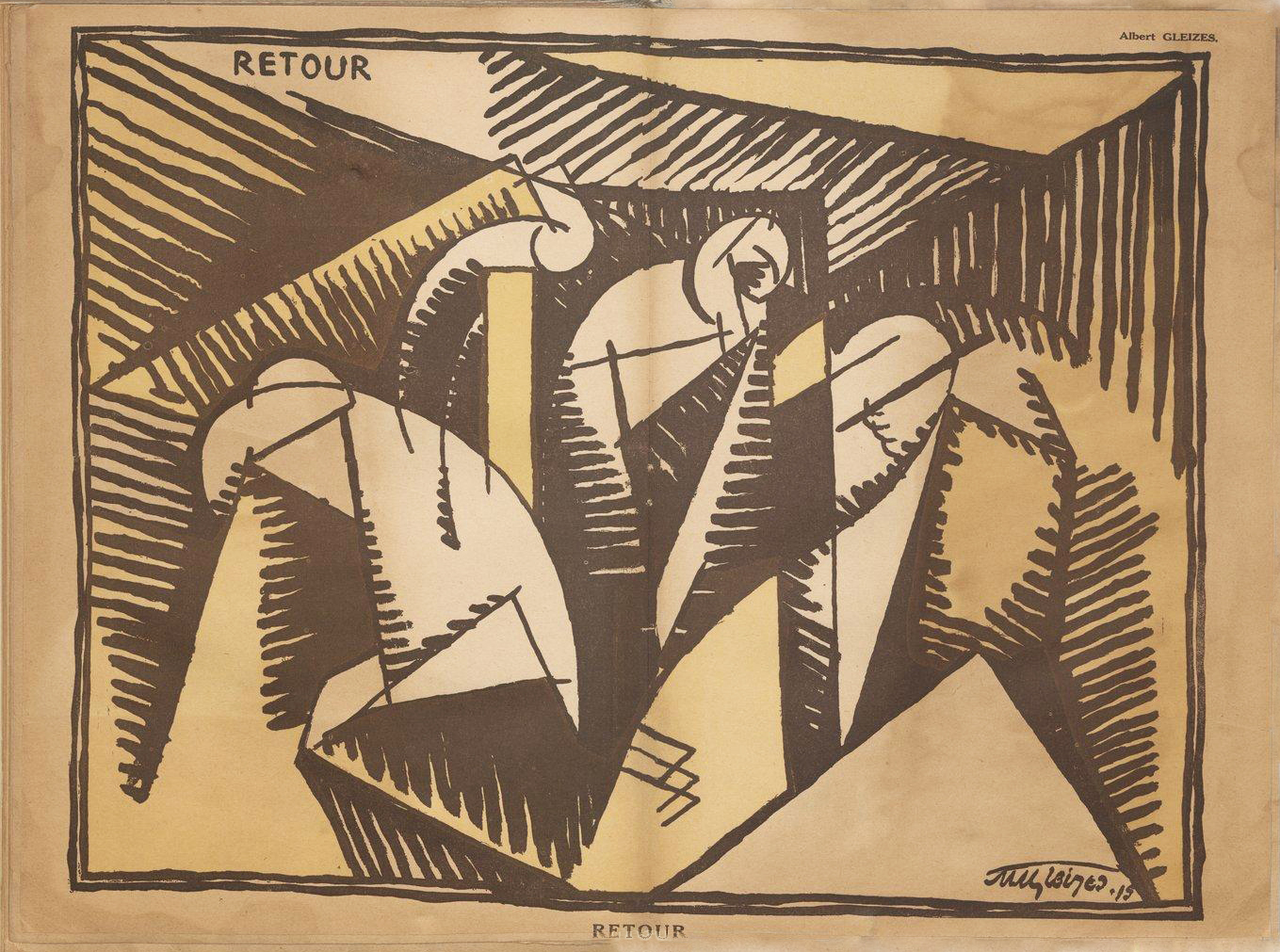
Albert Gleizes, 1915, Retour de Bois-le-Prêtre, wood engraving, 39 x 50 cm, published in Le mot, n. 20, 1 July 1915

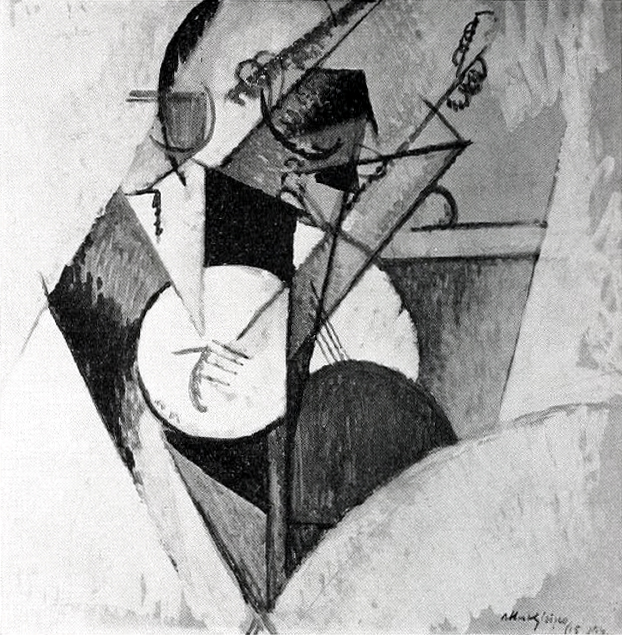
Albert Gleizes, 1915, Composition, For "Jazz", Pour "Jazz", oil on board, 73 x 73 cm. In a photograph first published in the Xeic York Herald, later reprinted in The Literary Digest, 27 October 1915, Gleizes can be seen at work on this painting

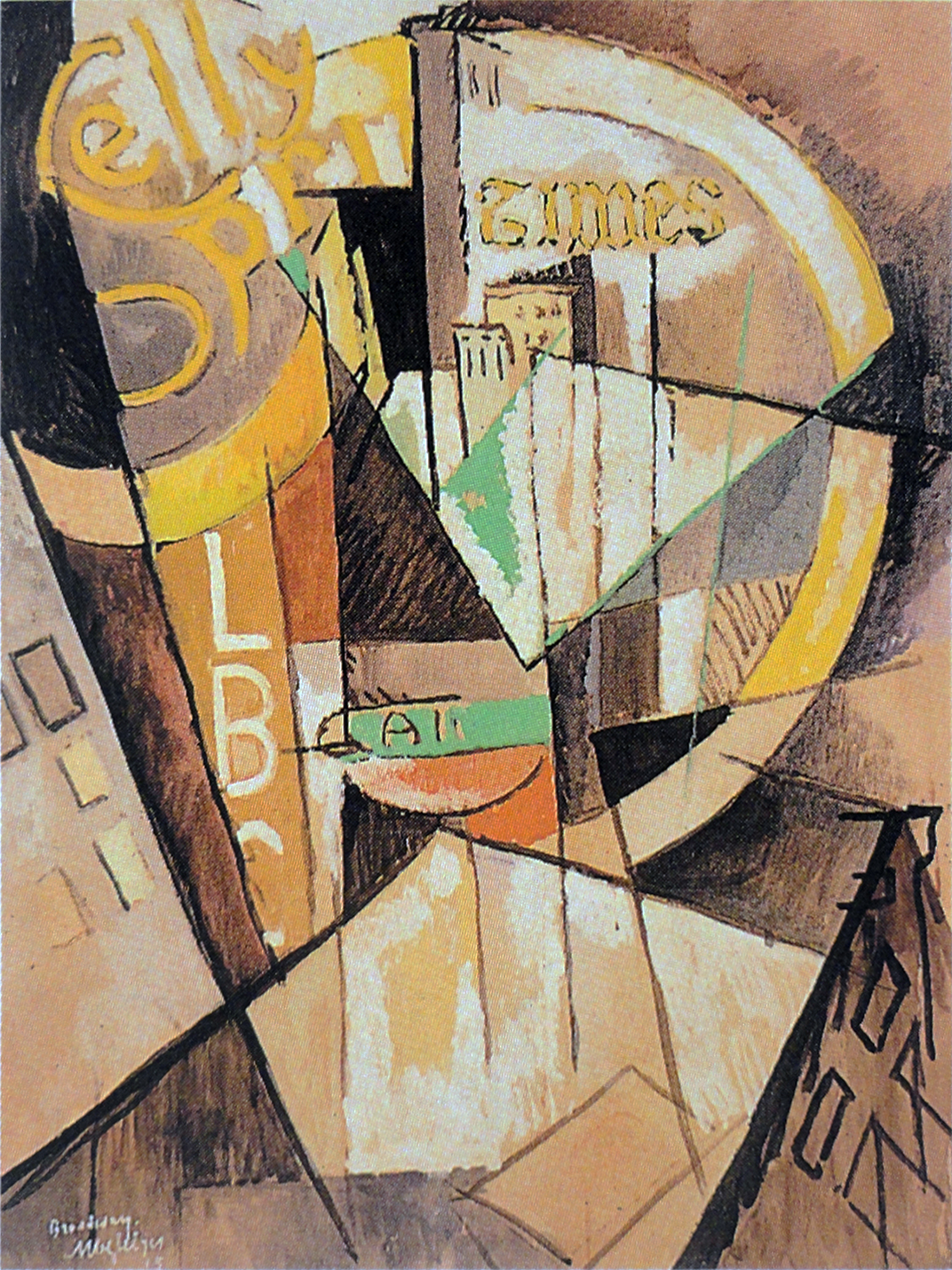
Albert Gleizes, 1915, Broadway, oil on board, 98.5 x 76 cm, private collection

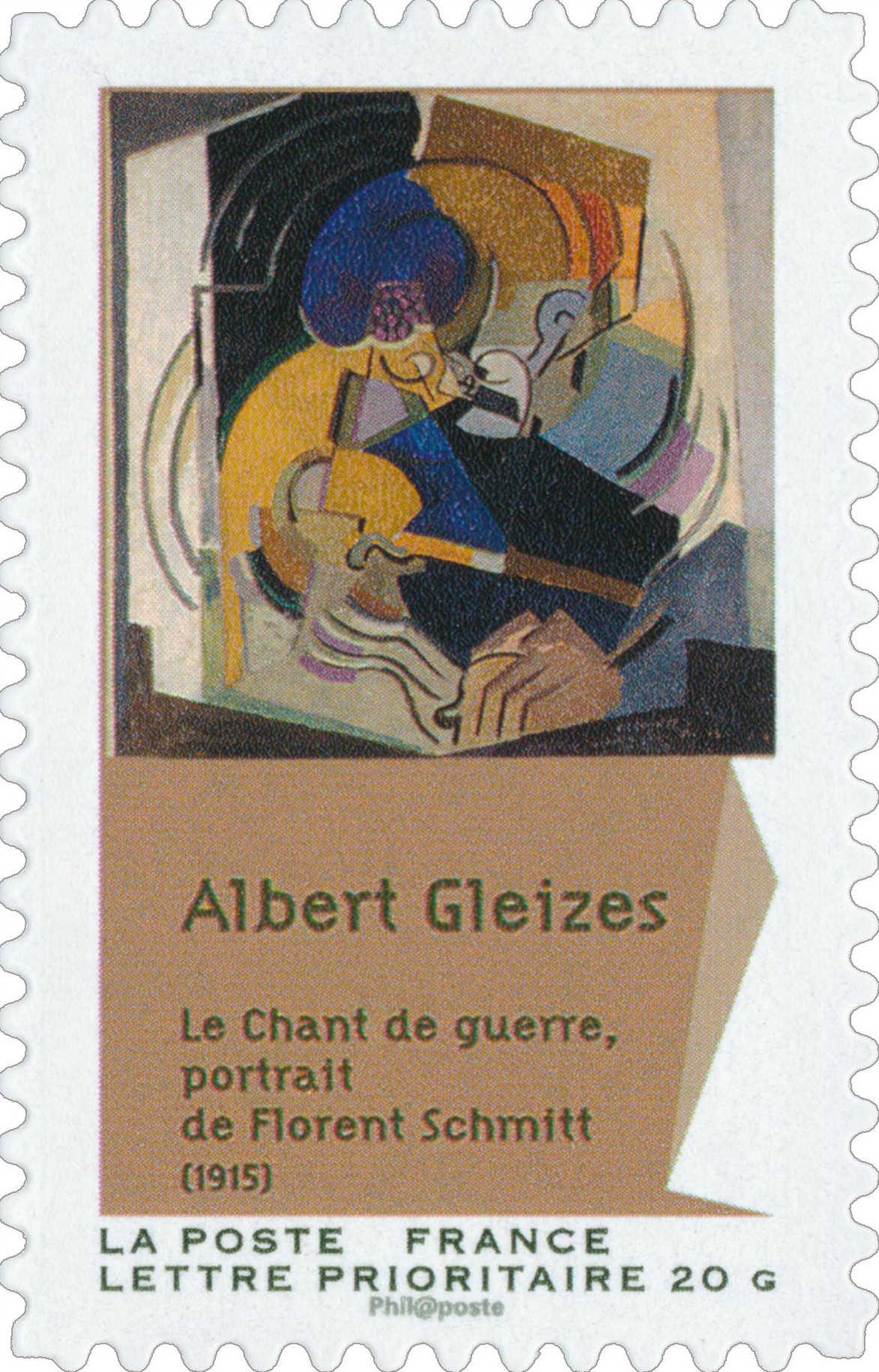
Albert Gleizes, 1915, Le Chant de guerre (Portrait de Florent Schmitt), postage stamp, carnet Du cubisme, La Poste, France, 2012

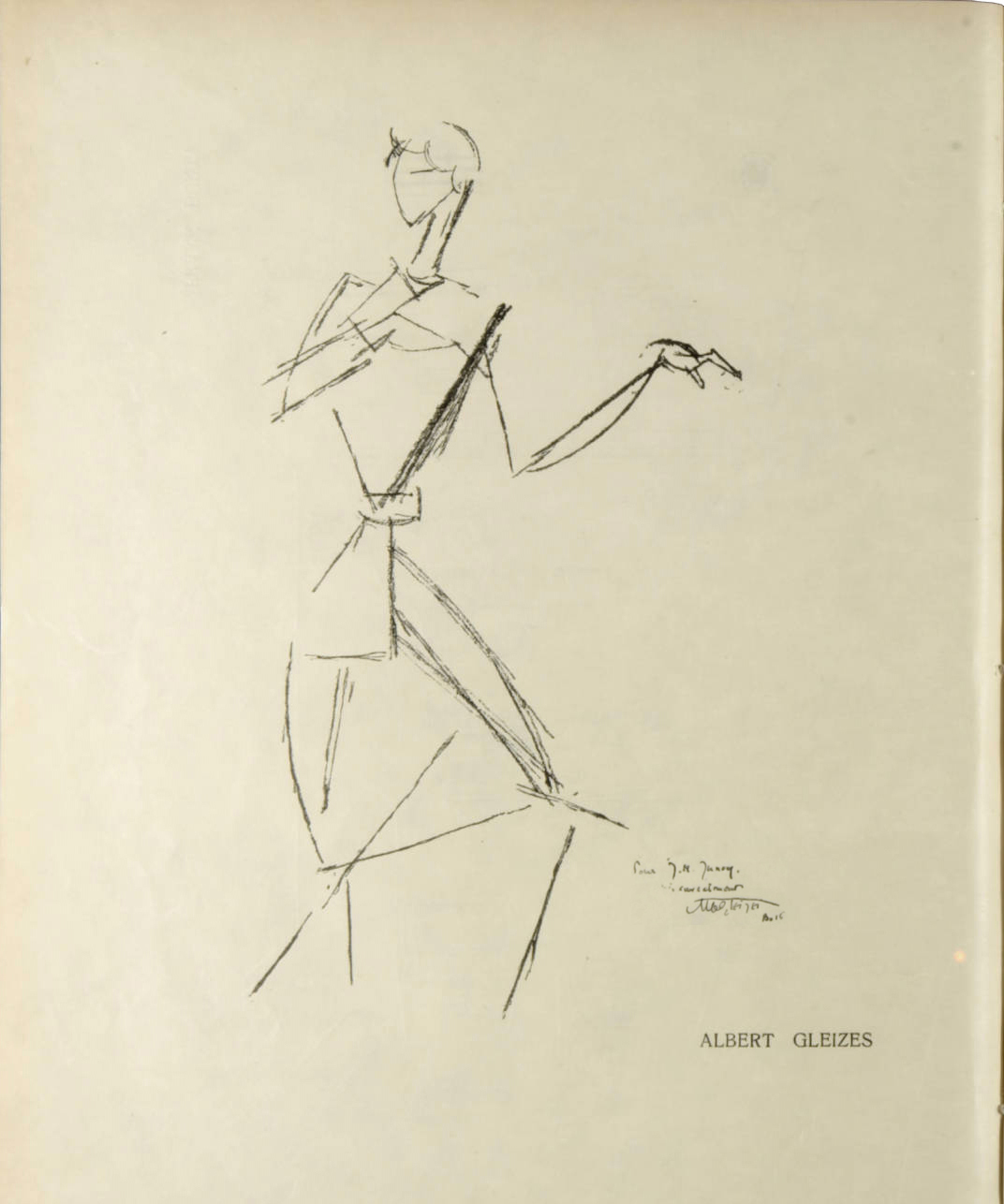
Albert Gleizes, 1915–16, Esquisse pour le portrait de Jean Cocteau

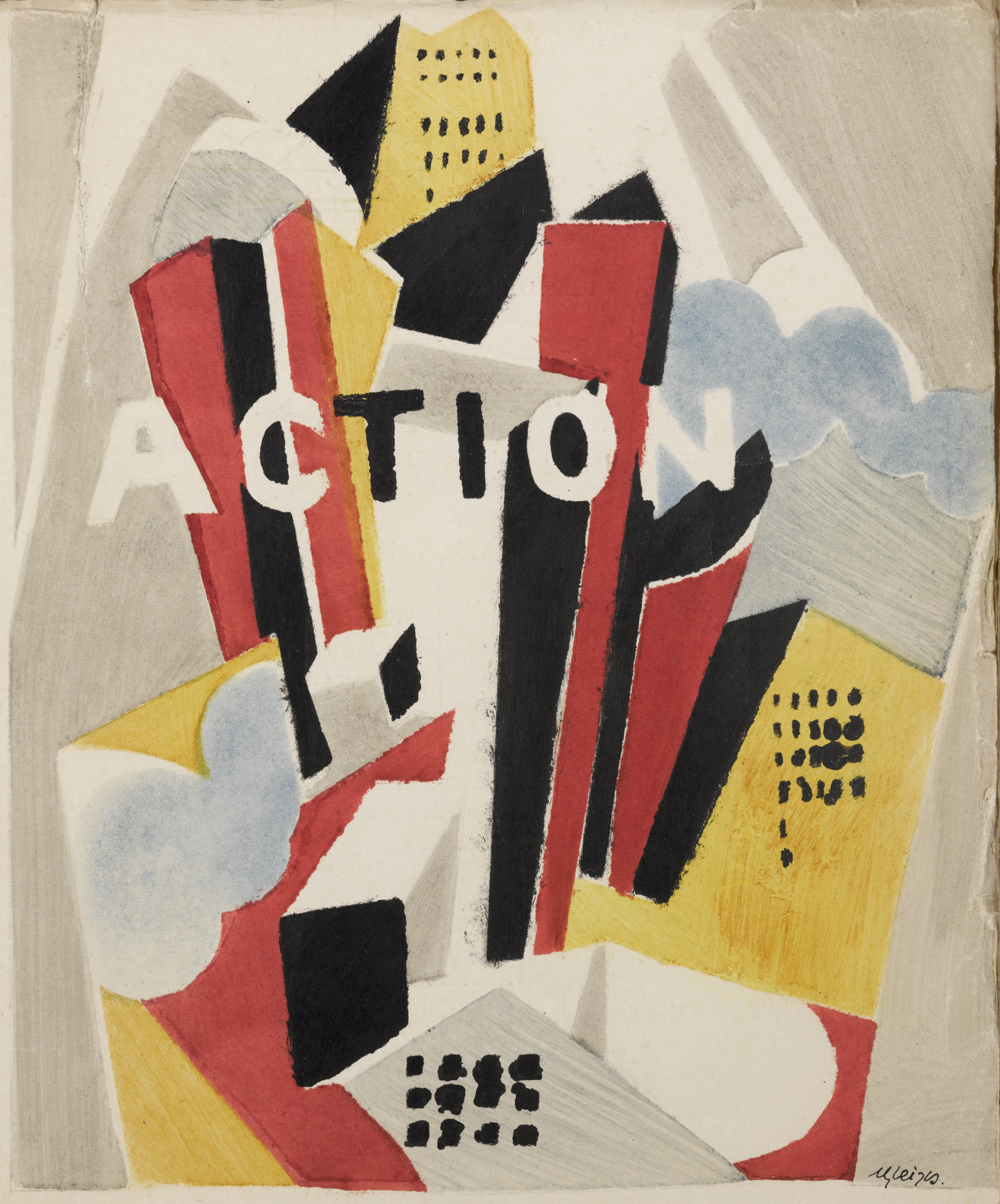
Albert Gleizes, Action, Cahiers Individualistes de philosophie et d'art, Volume 1, No. 1, February 1920

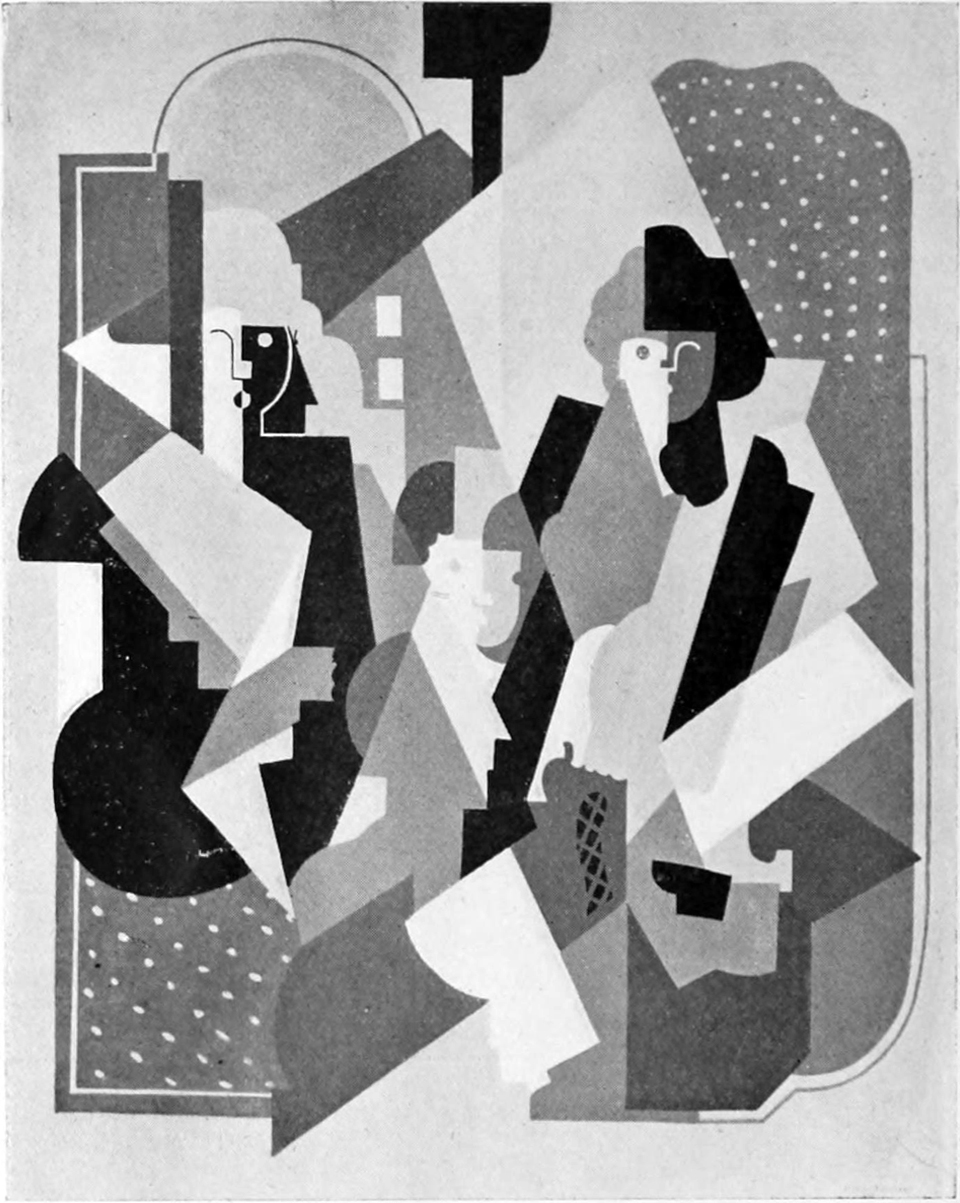
Albert Gleizes, c. 1920, Figures planes (Trois personages assis), dimensions approximately 126 x 100 cm, location unknown. Exhibited Der Sturm, Berlin, 1921 (no. 927) and reproduced in Gleizes 1927, p. 97

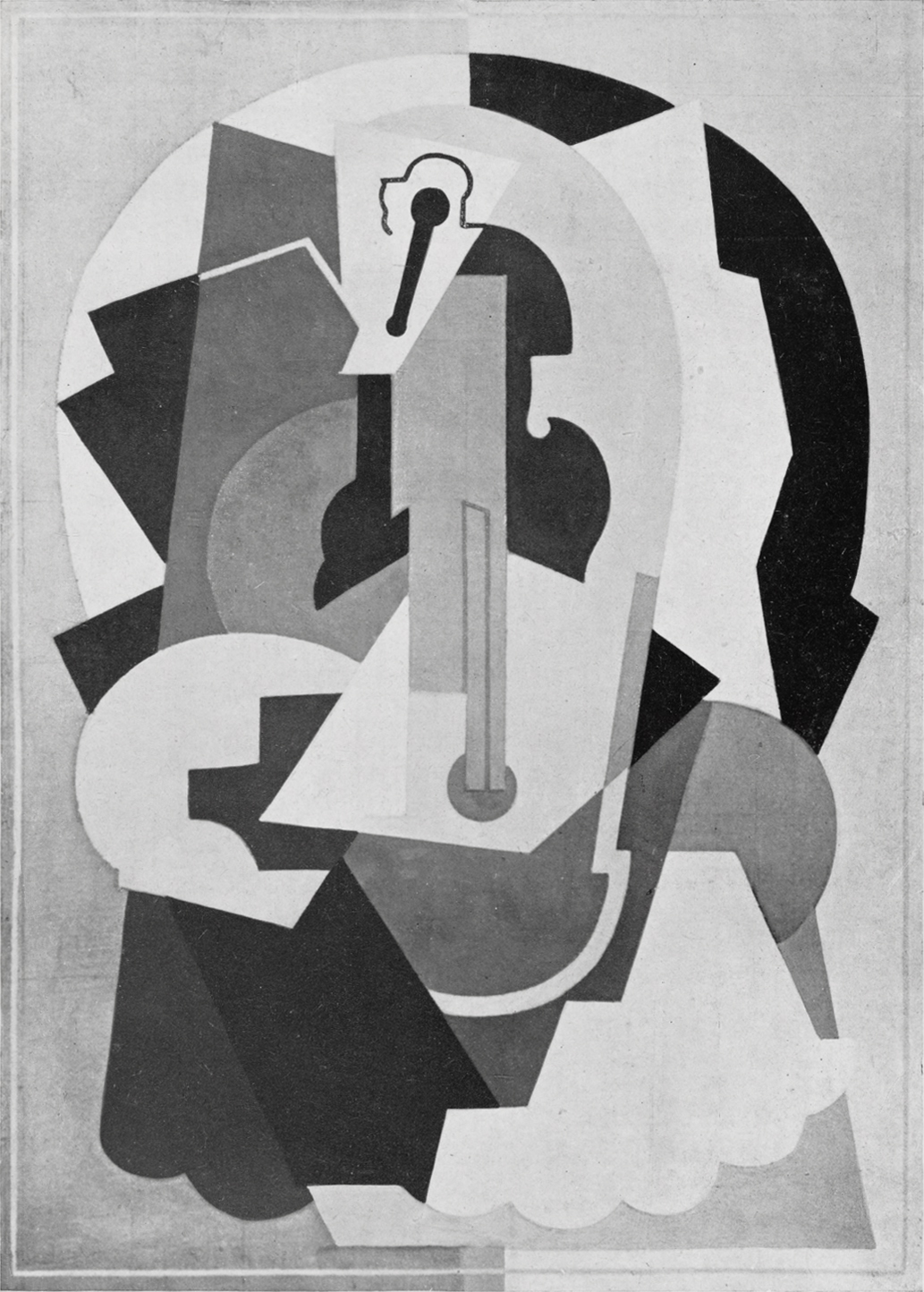
Albert Gleizes, 1920, Ecuyère, oil on canvas, 130 x 93 cm, Musée des Beaux-Arts de Rouen. Published in Broom, An International Magazine of the Arts, November 1921

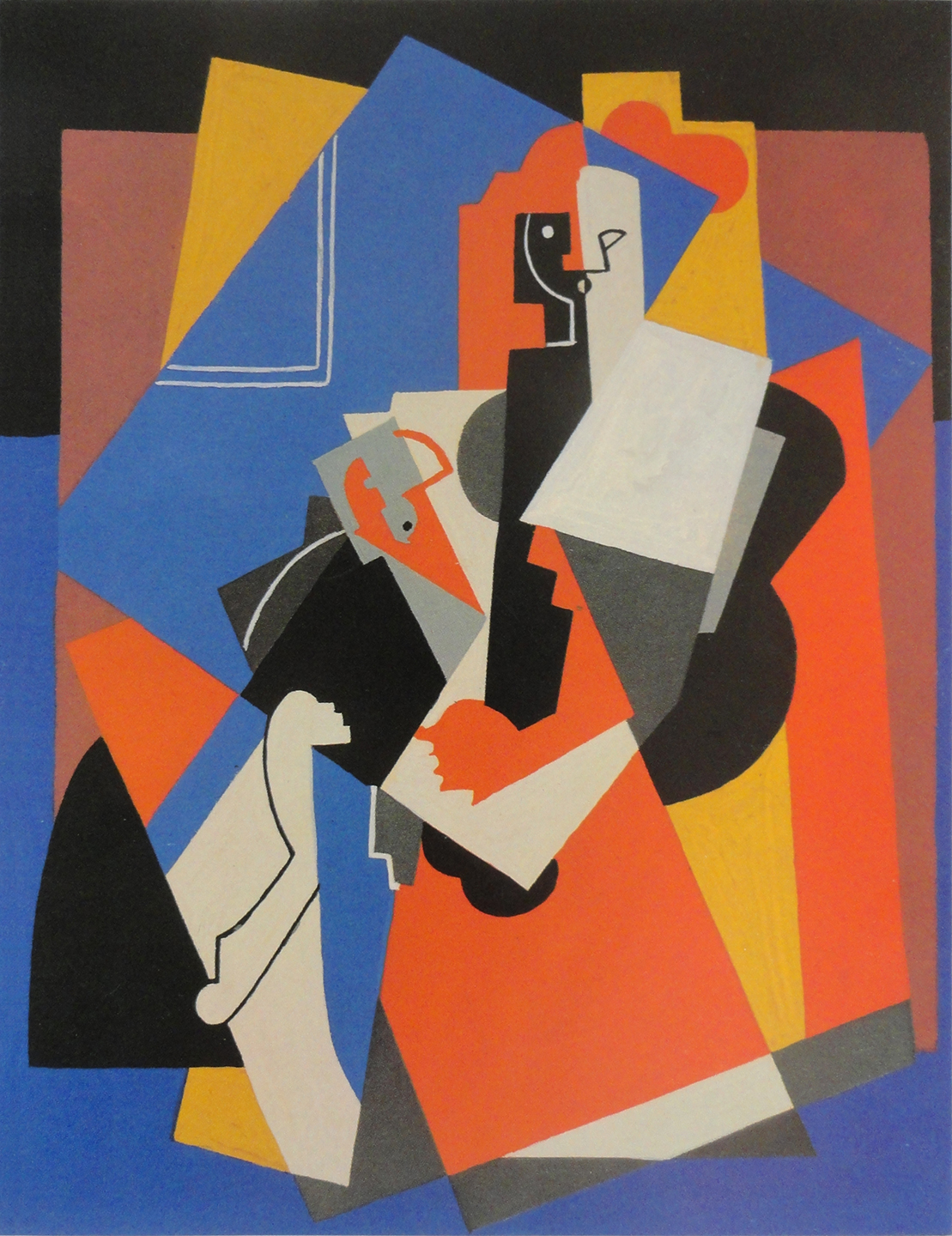
Albert Gleizes, Woman and child (Femme et enfant, Frau und Kind), Der Sturm, 5 October 1921

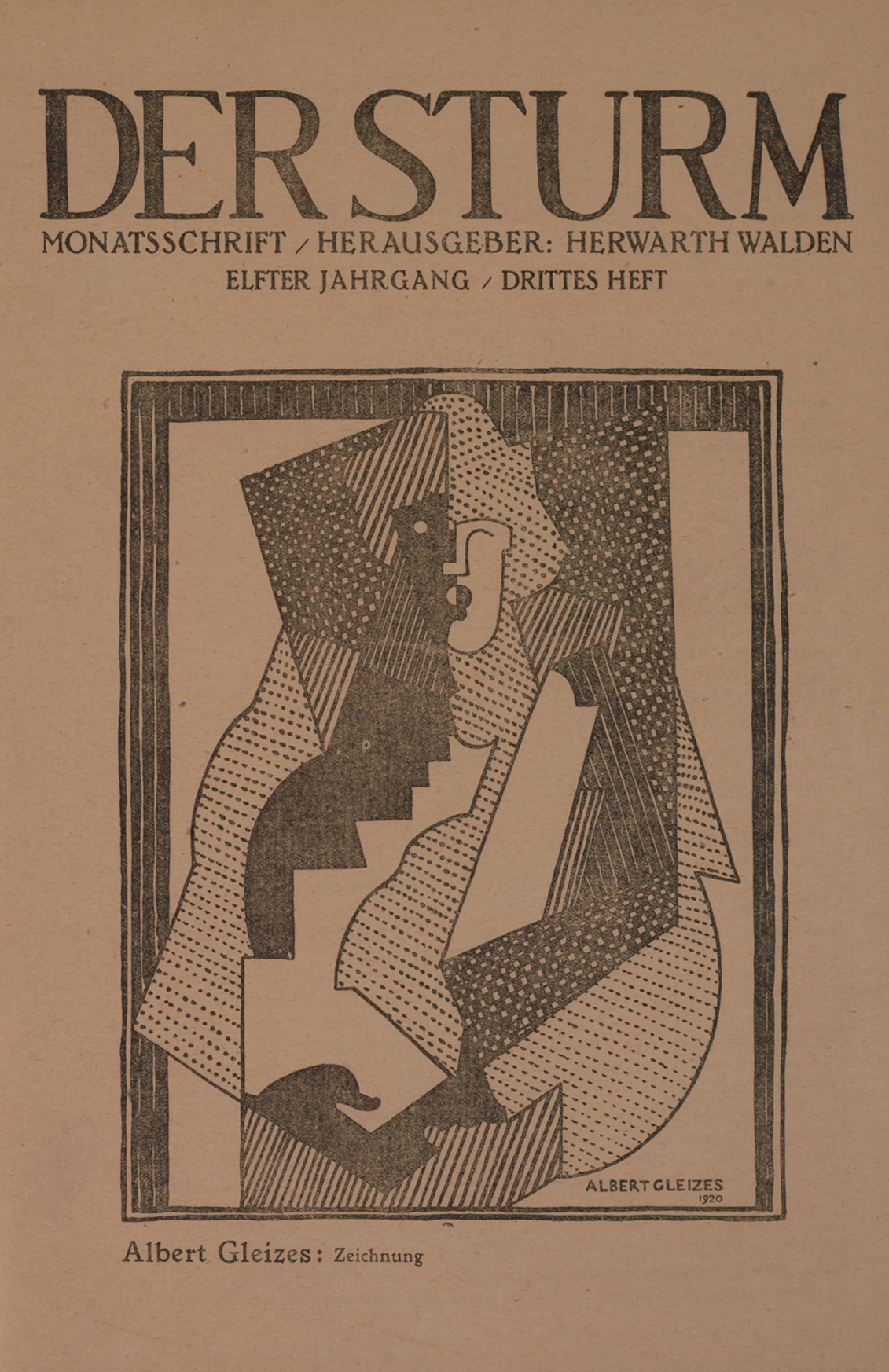
Albert Gleizes, study for Femme au gants noirs, drawing (zeichnung), published on the cover of Der Sturm, 5 June 1920

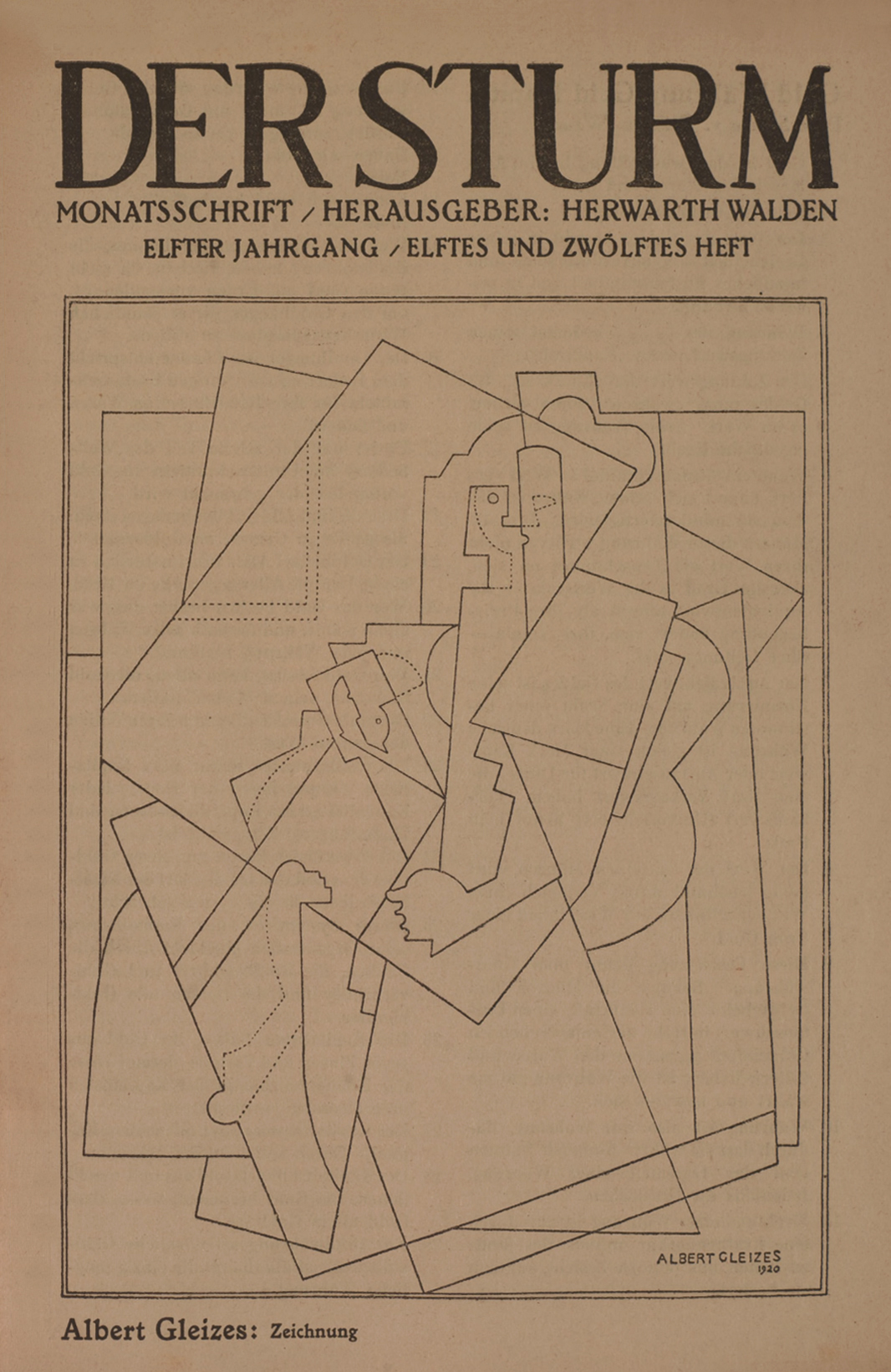
Albert Gleizes, untitled, drawing (zeichnung), published in the cover of Der Sturm, 5 June 1920

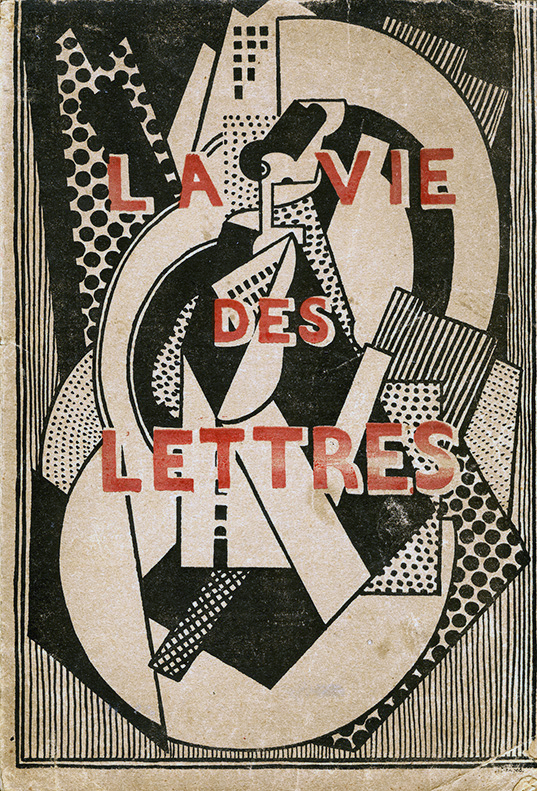
Albert Gleizes, c.1920, L'Homme dans les maisons, cover illustration of La Vie des Lettres et des Arts, Jacques Povolozky & Cie, Paris, 1920

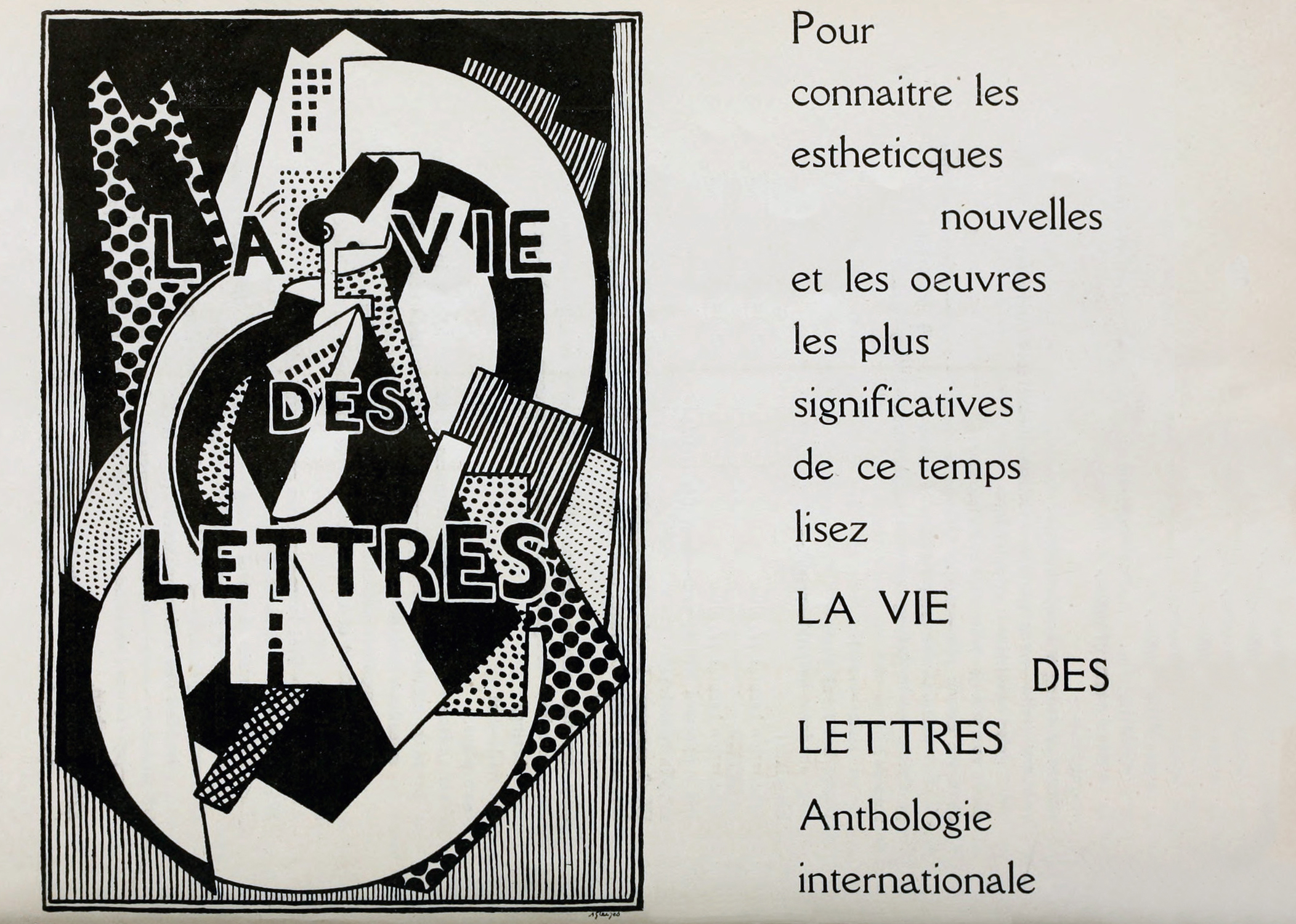
Albert Gleizes, c.1920, L'Homme dans les maisons. Cover illustration La Vie des Lettres et des Arts, 1920, reproduced in The Little Review, A Magazine of the Arts, Vol. 7, No. 4, 1921

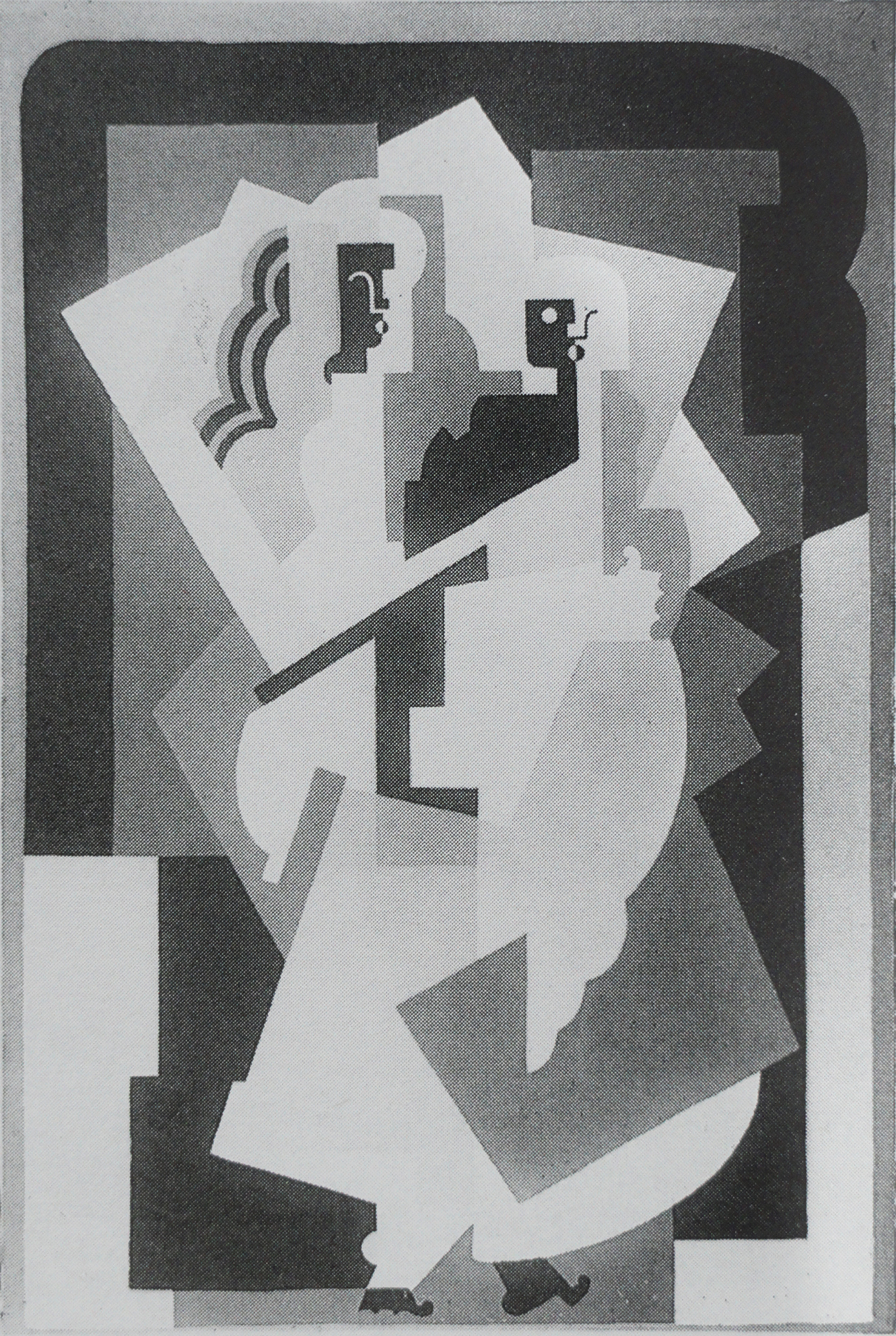
Albert Gleizes, 1920, Femme portant un enfant, Exposition Internationale d'Art Moderne, Geneva, 26 December 1920 - 25 January 1921, No. 185 (black and white photographic reproduction). Dimensions and whereabouts unknown. Cat. rais. no. 918, p. 316, 317

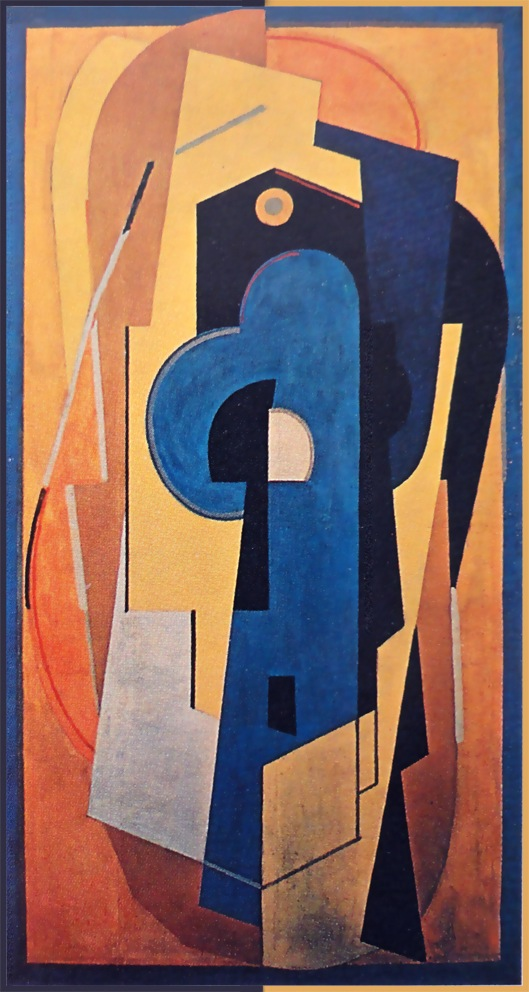
Albert Gleizes, 1921, Composition bleu et jaune (Composition jaune), oil on canvas, 200.5 x 110 cm

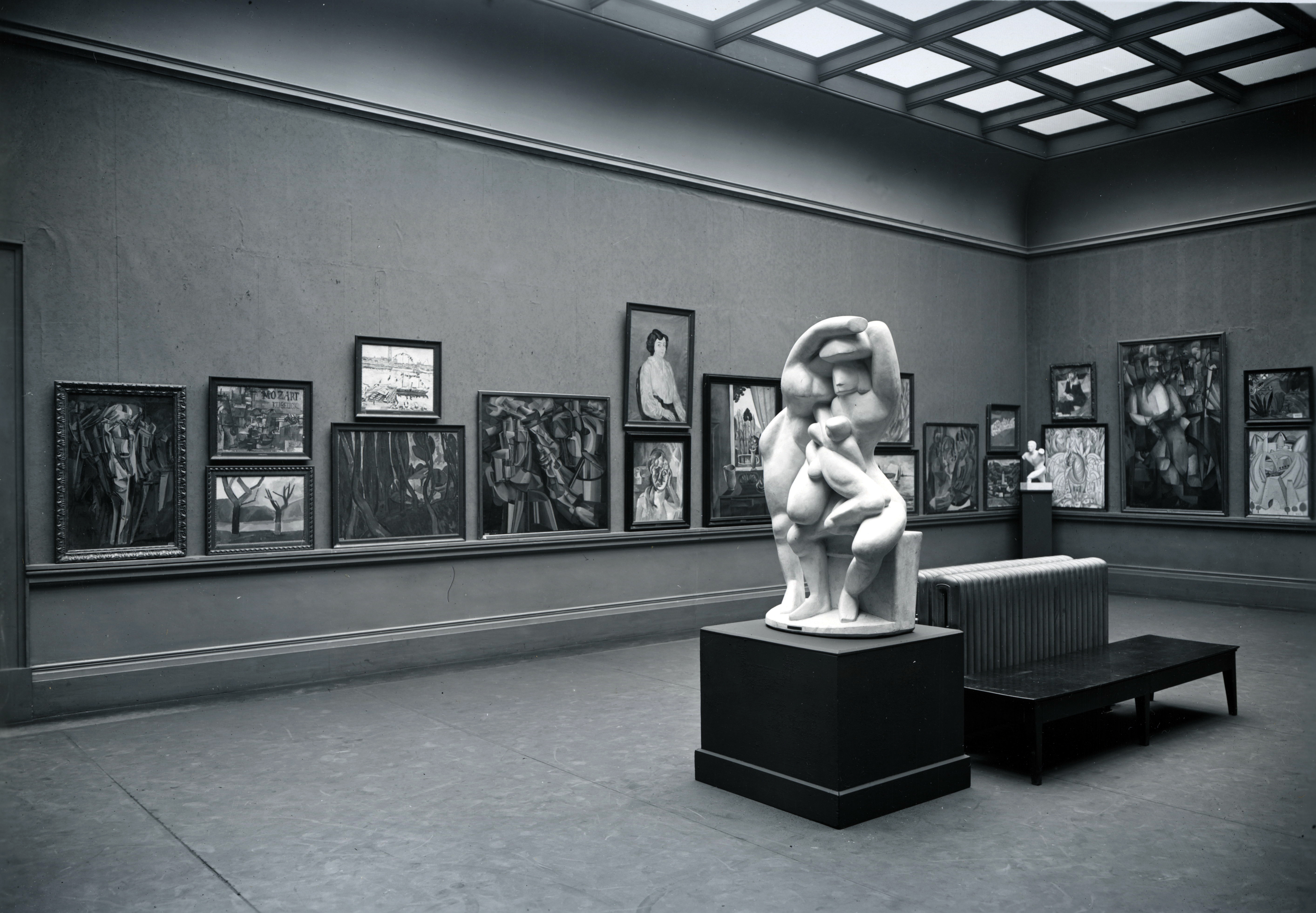
Armory Show, International Exhibition of Modern Art, Chicago, 1913. The Cubist room, Gallery 53 (northeast view), Art Institute of Chicago, March 24–April 16, 1913. Gleizes' Man on a Balcony is exhibited to the right

== Press articles ==
Albert Gleizes, Broadway (1915), Gleizes in his New York studio with Jazz (1915); Marcel Duchamp's Nude Descending a Staircase, No. 2; Jean Crotti in his studio. "The European Art-Invasion, The Mob as Art Critic", The Literary Digest, Letters and Art, 27 November 1915. pp. 1224-1227

Albert Gleizes, Portrait de Jacques Nayral (1911) and Jean Metzinger Le goûter (Tea Time) (1911), Fantasio, 15 October 1911

Paintings by Albert Gleizes, 1910–11, Paysage, Landscape; Juan Gris (drawing); Jean Metzinger, c.1911, Nature morte, Compotier et cruche décorée de cerfs. Front page of El Correo Catalán, 25 April 1912

Paintings by Juan Gris, Bodegón; August Agero (sculpture); Jean Metzinger, 1910–11, Deux Nus, Two Nudes, Gothenburg Museum of Art; Marie Laurencin (acrylic); Albert Gleizes, 1911, Paysage, Landscape. La Publicidad, 26 April 1912

Jean Metzinger, 1910–11, Paysage (whereabouts unknown); Gino Severini, 1911, La danseuse obsedante; Albert Gleizes, 1912, l'Homme au Balcon, Man on a Balcony (Portrait of Dr. Théo Morinaud). Les Annales politiques et littéraires, Sommaire du n. 1536, décembre 1912

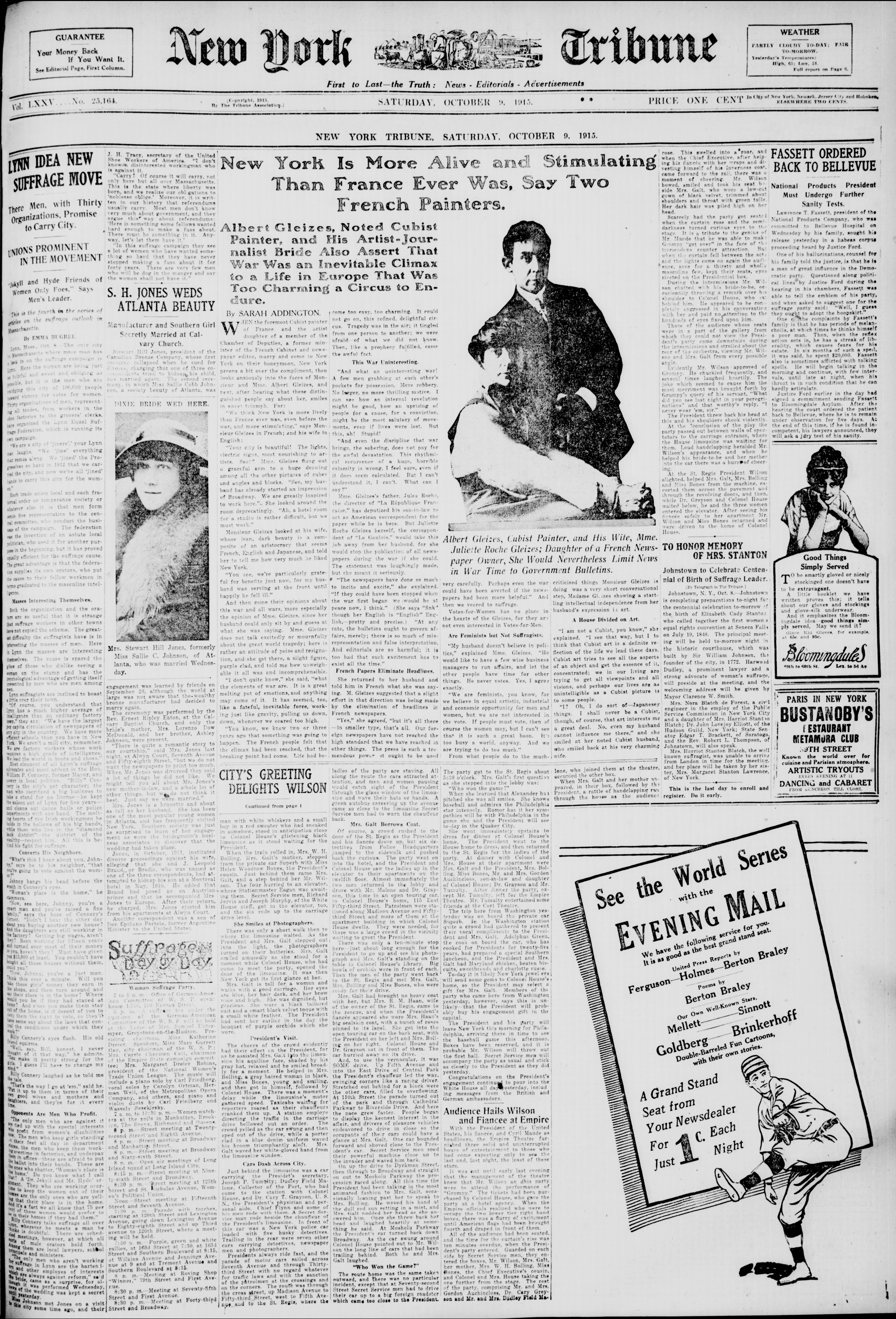
Albert Gleizes and his wife Juliette Roche-Gleizes, New York Tribune, New York, 9 October 1915

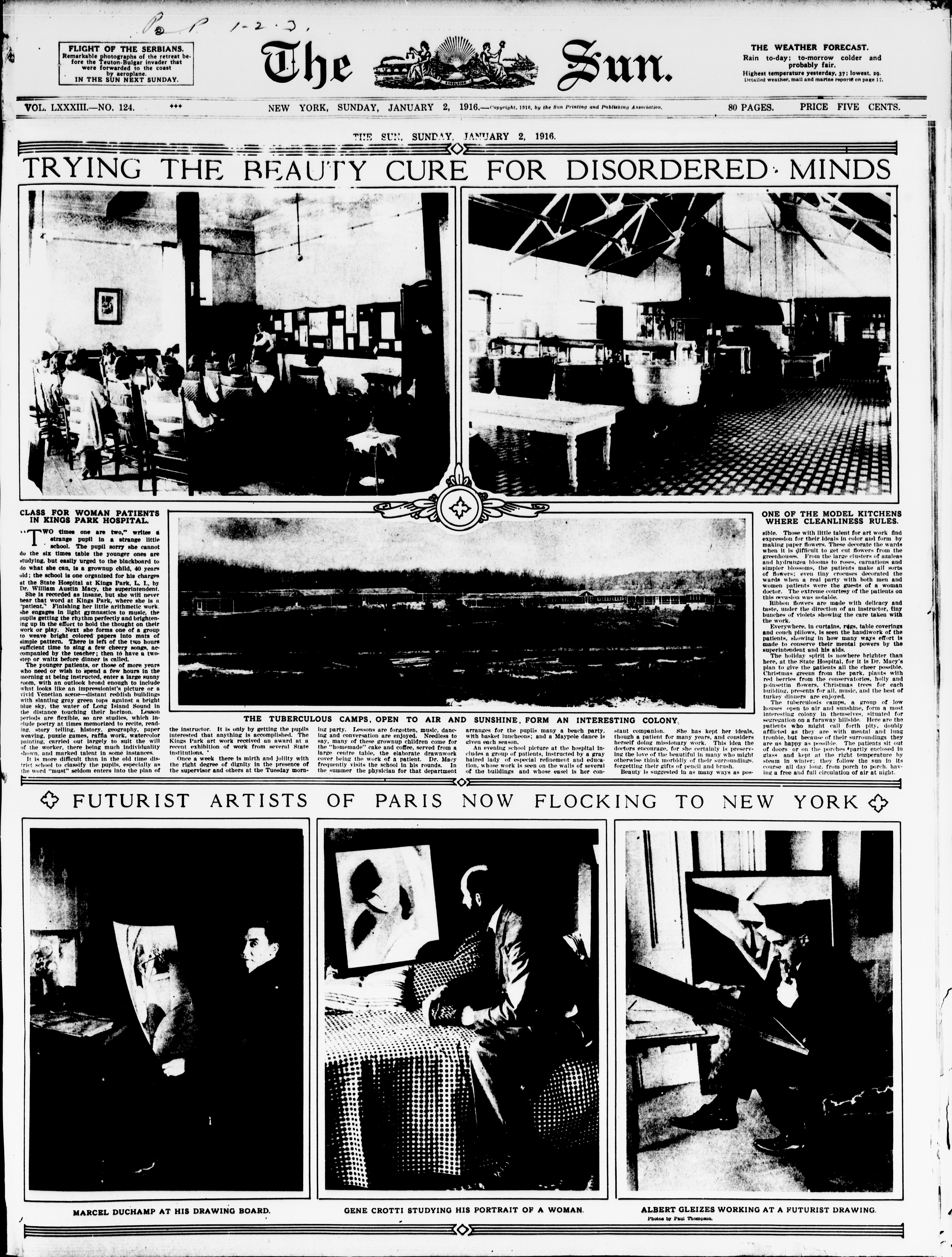
Albert Gleizes, (left) in front of his painting Jazz; Jean Crotti (center) studying his Femme à la toque rouge; Marcel Duchamp (right) at his drawing board, in front of Jacques Villon's Portrait de M. J. B. peintre, The Sun, New York, 2 January 1916

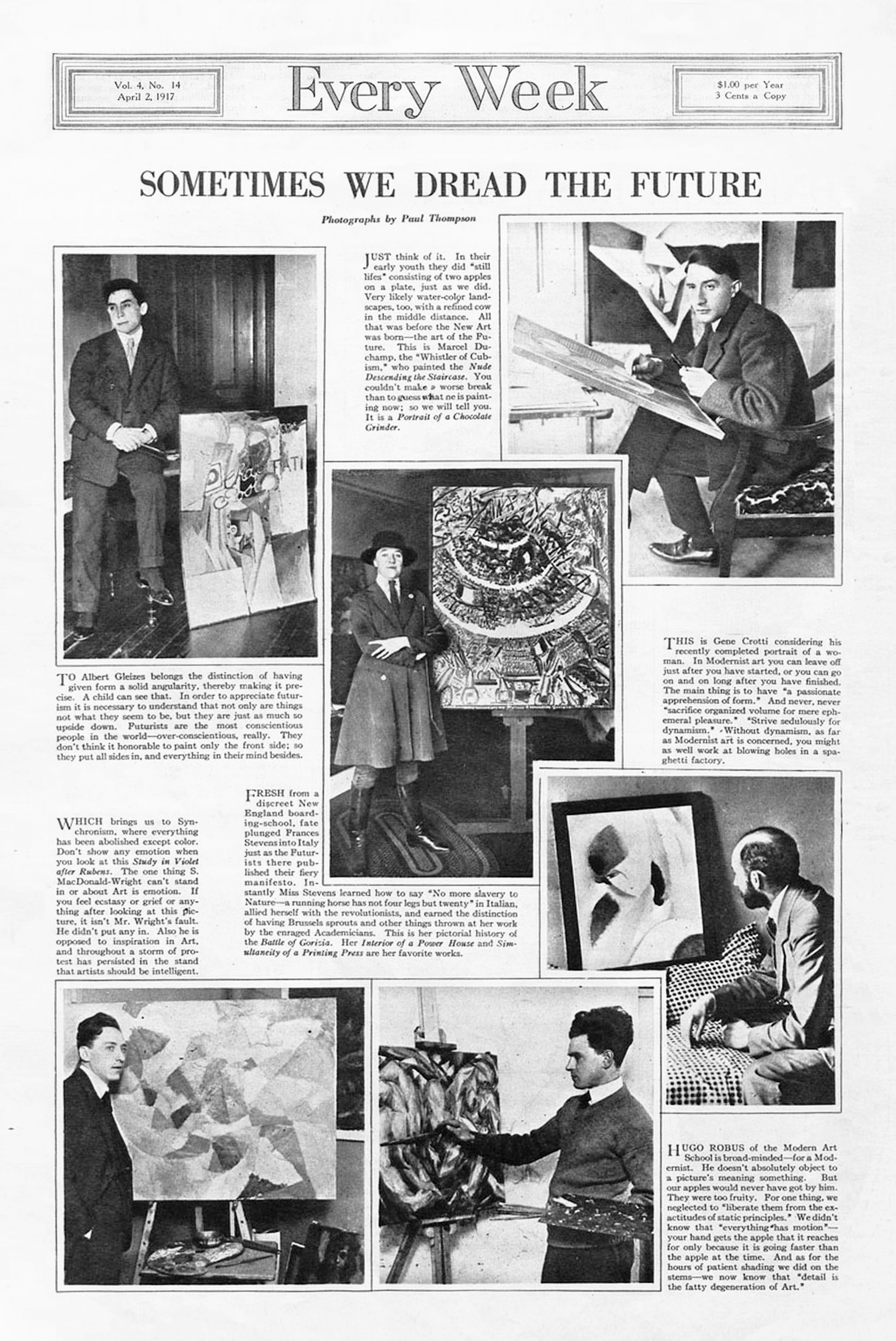
Albert Gleizes (with Chal Post, 1915); Marcel Duchamp (with his brother Jacques Villon's Portrait de M. J. B. peintre (Jacques Bon) 1914); Jean Crotti; Hugo Robus; Stanton Macdonald-Wright; and Frances Simpson Stevens (center), Sometimes we dread the future, Every Week, Vol. 4, No. 14, April 2, 1917, p. 14

Paintings by Gino Severini, 1911, Souvenirs de Voyage; Albert Gleizes, 1912, Man on a Balcony, L’Homme au balcon; Severini, 1912–13, Portrait de Mlle Jeanne Paul-Fort; Luigi Russolo, 1911–12, La Révolte, Les Annales politiques et littéraires, Le Paradoxe Cubiste, n. 1916, 14 March 1920

== Writings ==
=== Books ===
- Du "Cubisme", Albert Gleizes and Jean Metzinger, Paris, Figuière, 1912 (published in English and Russian in 1913, a new edition was published in 1947)
- Du Cubisme et des moyens de le comprendre, Paris, La Cible, Povolozky, 1920 (published in German in 1922).
- La Mission créatrice de l’Homme dans le domaine plastique, Paris, La Cible, Povolozky, 1921 (published in Polish in 1927).
- La Peinture et ses lois, ce qui devait sortir du Cubisme, Paris, 1924 (published in English in 2000)
- Tradition et Cubisme. Vers une conscience plastique. Articles et Conférences 1912–1924, Paris, La Cible, Povolozky, 1927
- Peinture et Perspective descriptive, conference at the Carnegie Foundation for l’Union Intellectuelle française, Paris, 22 March 1927. Sablons, Moly-Sabata, 1927
- Kubismus, Bauhausbücher 13, Munich, Albert Langen Verlag, 1928 (re-edited by Florian Kupferberg Verlag in 1980).
- Vie et Mort de l’Occident Chrétien, Sablons, Moly-Sabata, 1930 (published in English in 1947)
- Vers une Conscience plastique : La Forme et l’Histoire, Paris, Povolozky, 1932
- Art et Science, Sablons, Moly-Sabata, 1933. 2ème édition, Aix-en-Provence, 1961. Conference at Lodz, Poland, 28 April 1932, and Stuttgart, 6 Mai 1932.
- Homocentrisme; Le retour de l’Homme chrétien; Le Rythme dans les Arts plastiques, Sablons, Moly-Sabata, 1937
- La Signification Humaine du Cubisme, Lecture by Albert Gleizes at the Petit Palais, Paris, 18 July 1938, Sablons, Moly-Sabata, 1938
- Du Cubisme, Albert Gleizes and Jean Metzinger, Paris, Compagnie Française des Arts Graphiques, 1947 (re-edition of the 1912 book with slight modifications and a new Preface by Albert Gleizes).
- Souvenirs, le Cubisme 1908–1914, Lyon, Cahiers Albert Gleizes, L’Association des Amis d’Albert Gleizes, 1957
- Puissances du Cubisme, Chambéry, éditions Présence, 1969. Collection of articles published between 1925 and 1946
- Art et religion, Art et science, Art et production, Chambéry, éditions Présence, 1970 (published in English in 2000)
- L'Homme devenu peintre, Paris, Fondation Albert Gleizes and Somogy éditions d'Art, 1998

=== Articles ===
- L'Art et ses représentants. Jean Metzinger, Revue Indépendante, Paris, September 1911, pp. 161–172
- Le Fauconnier et son oeuvre, Revue Indépendante, Paris, October 1911 Unlocated article listed in Le Fauconnier bibliographies
- Les Beaux Arts. A propos du Salon d'Automne, Les Bandeaux d'Or, séries 4, no. 13, 1911–1912, pp. 42–51
- Cubisme devant les Artistes, Les Annales politiques et littéraires, Paris, December 1912, pp. 473–475. A response to an inquiry
- Le Cubisme et la Tradition, Montjoie!, Paris, 10 February 1913, p. 4. Reprinted in Tradition et Cubisme, Paris, 1927
- [Extracts from O Kubisme], Soyuz Molodezhi, Sbornik, St. Petersburg, no. 3, 1913. With commentary. Reference from gray, Camilla. The Great Experiment: Russian Art, 1893–1922, New York, Abrams, 1962, p. 308
- Opinions (Mes Tableaux), Montjoie!, Paris, nos. 11–12, November–December 1913, p. 14
- C’est en allant se jeter à la mer que le fleuve reste fidèle à sa source, Le Mot, Paris, vol. I, no. 17, 1 Mai 1915
- French Artists Spur on American Art, New York Herald, 24 October 1915, pp. 2–3. An interview
- Interview with Gleizes (Duchamp, Picabia and Crotti), The Literary Digest, New York, 27 November 1915, pp. 1224–1225
- "La Peinture Moderne", 391, New York, no. 5, June 1917, pp. 6–7
- The Abbey of Créteil, A Communistic Experiment, The Modern School, Stelton, New Jersey, October 1918. Edited by Carl Zigrosser
- "The Impersonality of American Art", Playboy, New York, nos. 4 and 5, 1919, pp. 25–26. Translated by Stephen Bourgeois.
- Preface to the catalogue of Annual Exhibition of Modern Art at the Bourgeois Galleries, New York, 1919
- Vers une époque de bâtisseurs", Clarté (Bulletin Français), Paris, 1920, no. 13, 14, 15, 32
- Letter to Herwarth Walden, 30 April 1920], Der Sturm, Berlin, Nationalgalerie, September 1961, p. 46
- L’Affaire dada. Action, Paris, no. 3, April 1920, pp. 26–32. Re-printed in English in Motherwell, Robert, ed. Dada Painters and Poets, New York, 1951, pp. 298–302
- Dieu Nouveau, La Vie des Lettres, Paris, October 1920, p. 178
- Réhabilitation des Arts Plastiques, La Vie des Lettres et des Arts, Paris, series 2, no. 4, April 1921, pp. 411–122. Reprinted in Tradition et Cubisme, Paris, 1927
- L'Etat du Cubisme aujourd'hui, La Vie des Lettres et des Arts, Paris, series 2, no. 15, 1922, pp. 13–17
- Tradition und Freiheit, Das Kunstblatt, Berlin, vol. 6, no. 1, 1922, pp. 26–32
- Ein Neuer Naturalismus? Eine Rundfrage des Kunstblatts, Das Kunstblatt, Berlin, vol. 6, no. 9, 1922, pp. 387–389
- Perle, La Bataille Littéraire, Brussels, vol. 4, no. 2, 25 February 1922, pp. 35–36 [A poem, New York, 1916]
- La Peinture et ses Lois : Ce qui devait sortir du Cubisme, La Vie des Lettres et des Arts, Paris, series 2, no. 12, March 1923, pp. 26–73
- Jean Lurçat, Das Kunstblatt, vol. 7, no. 8, 1923, pp. 225–228
- L’Art moderne et la Société nouvelle, Moniteur de l’Académie Socialiste, Moscou, 1923. Reprinted in Tradition et Cubisme, Paris, 1927, pp. 149–161
- Où va la peinture moderne? Bulletin de l’Effort Moderne, Paris, no. 5, May 1924, p. 14. Response to an inquiry
- La Renaissance et la peinture d'aujourd'hui, La Vie des Lettres et des Arts, Paris, décembre 1924 (repris dans Tradition et Cubisme, Paris, 1927, p. 179–191)
- La Peinture et ses Lois, Bulletin de l’Effort Moderne, Paris, no. 5, May 1924, p. 4–9, no. 13, March 1925, p. 1–4
- A propos de la Section d'Or de 1912, Les Arts Plastiques, Paris, no. 1, January,1925, pp. 5–7
- Chez les Cubistes: une enquête, Bulletin de la Vie Artistique, Paris, vol. 6, no. 1, January 1925, pp. 15–19. Response to an inquiry
- L’inquiétude, Crise plastique, La Vie des Lettres et des Arts, Paris, series 2, no. 20, May 1925, pp. 38–52
- A l'Exposition, que pensez-vous du... Pavilion de Russie, Bulletin de la Vie Artistique, vol. 6, no. 11, 1 June 1925, pp. 235–237. Response to an inquiry
- "Cubisme", La Vie des Lettres et des Arts, Paris, series 2, no. 21, 1926, pp. 51–65. Announced as French text of Kubismus, Bauhausbücher 13, Munich, 1928, written in September 1925, at Serrières
- Cubisme (Vers une conscience plastique). Bulletin de l'Effort Moderne, Paris, No. 22, February 1926; No. 23, March 1926; No. 24, April 1926; no. 25, May 1926; No. 26, June 1926; no. 27, July 1926; no. 28, October 1926; no. 29, November 1926; no. 30, December 1926; no. 31, January 1927; no. 32, February 1927. Extracts, announced as partial contents of Kubismus, Bauhausbücher 13, 1928
- L’Epopée. De la Forme immobile à la Forme mobile, Le Rouge et le Noir, Paris, October 1929, pp. 57–99. The final French text of Kubismus, Bauhausbücher 13, Munich, Albert Langen Verlag, 1928 (re-edited by Florian Kupferberg Verlag in 1980).
- Charles Henry et le Vitalisme, Cahiers de l'Etoile, Paris, no. 13, January–February 1930, pp. 112–128. [Preface to La Forme et l'Histoire], l'Alliance Universelle, Paris, 30 April 1930
- Les Attitudes Fondamentales de l'Esprit Moderne, Bulletin de la VIIème Congrès de la Fédération Internationale des Unions Intellectuelles, Kraków, October 1930. [Preface to an Exhibition of Paintings by Gottfried Graf, Berlin, 1931]. Quoted in Chevalier, Le Dénouement traditionnel du Cubisme, 2, Confluences, Lyon, no. 8, February 1942, p. 193
- Civilization et Propositions, La Semaine Egyptienne, Alexandria, 31 October 1932, p. 5
- Moly-Sabata ou le Retour des Artistes au Village, Sud Magazine, Marseilles, no. 1021, 1 June 1932. [Statement], Abstraction-Creation, Art Non-Figuratif, Paris, no. 1, 1932, pp. 15–16
- La Grande Ville et Ses Signes, La Liberté, Paris, 7 May 1933, p. 2
- Vers la régénération intellectuelle, Naturisme du corps: naturisme de l'esprit, Régénération, Paris, new series, no. 46, July–August 1933, pp. 117–119. [Statement], Abstraction-Creation, Art Non-Figuratif, Paris, no. 2, 1933, p. 18
- Vers une conscience plastique, La Forme et l'Histoire, Sud, magazine méditerranéen, no. 104, 1–16 July 1933, p. 20–21
- Propos de peintre, Almanach Vivarois 1933, Sous le signe de July 1933, p. 30–34. May 2007
- Le Retour de l’Homme à sa Vie, Jeunesse, and Jeunesse (suite), Régénération, Paris, no. 49, 50, 53, 1934. [Expose] Abstraction-Création, Art Non Figuratif, Paris, no. 3, 1934, p. 18
- Agriculture et Machinisme, Regeneration, Paris, no. 53, August–September 1934, pp. 11–14. Enlarged version of article originally published in Lyon Républicain, 1 January 1932
- Le Groupe de l'Abbaye. La Nouvelle Abbaye de Moly-Sabata, Cahiers Américains, Paris, New York, no. 6, Winter 1934, pp. 253–259
- Le Retour à la Terre, Beaux-Arts, Paris, 14 December 1934, p. 2
- Peinture et Peinture, Sud Magazine, Marseilles, no. 8, August 1935. Offprint. (In Puissances du Cubisme, 1969, pp. 185–199)
- Retour à l’Homme. Mais à quel Homme?, December 1935. Offprint, Sud Magazine, Marseilles. (In Puissances du Cubisme, 1969, pp. 201–218)
- Arabesques, Cahiers du Sud, (special edition), L’Islam et l’Occident, vol. 22, no. 175, August–September 1935, pp. 101–106. (In Puissances du Cubisme, 1969, pp. 169–175)
- Article dated Serrières d'Ardèche, November 1934. [Statement], Abstraction-Creation, Art Non-Figuratif, Paris, no. 5, 1936, pp. 7–8
- La Question de Métier, Beaux-Arts, Paris, 9 October 1936, p. 1
- Art Régional, Tous les Arts à Paris, Paris, 15 December 1936
- Le Problème de la Lumière, Cahiers du Sud, vol. 24, no. 192, March 1937, pp. 190–207. (From d'Homocentrisme, also in Puissance du cubisme, 1969, pp. 245–267)
- Cubisme et Surréalisme: Deux Tentatives Pour Redécouvrir l'Homme, Deuxième Congrés international d'esthétique et de science de l'art, Paris, 1937, II p. 337. (In Puissances du cubisme, 1969, p. 269–282)
- Tradition et Modernisme, l'Art et les Artistes, Paris, no. 37, January 1939, pp. 109–115
- L'Oeuvre de Maurice Garnier, Sud Magazine, Marseille, mars-avril 1939, p. 15–17
- Artistes et Artisans, L’Opinion, Cannes, 31 May 1941
- Spiritualité, Rythme, Forme, Confluences: Les Problèmes de la Peinture, Lyon, 1945, section 6. Special edition, edited by Gaston Diehl. (In Puissance du cubisme, 1969, p. 315–344)
- Apollinaire, la Justice et Moi, Guillaume Apollinaire, Souvenirs et Témoignages, Paris, Editions de la Tête Noire, 1946, pp. 53–65. Edited by Marcel Adema
- L’Arc en Ciel, clé de l’Art chrétien médiéval, Les Etudes Philosophiques, new series, no. 2, April–June 1946. [Statement], Réalités Nouvelles, Paris, no. 1, 1947, pp. 34–35 (In Puissances du cubisme, 1969, p. 345–357)
- Réalités Nouvelles, Paris, no. 1, 1947, p. 34–35. Préliminaires à une étude sur les variations iconographiques de la Croix, Témoignages, Cahiers de la Pierre-qui-Vire, no. 15, October 1947
- Life and Death of the Christian West, Londres, Dennis Dobson Ltd., 1947. Preface by H. J. Massingham, translation by Aristide Messinesi
- Y a-t-il un Art Traditionnel Chrétien ?, Témoignages, Cahiers de la Pierre-qui-Vire, July 1948
- L’Art Sacré est Théologique et Symbolique, Arts, Paris, no. 148, 9 January 1948, p. 8
- Active Tradition of the East and West, Art and Thought, Londres, February 1948, p. 244–251 (Ananda K. Coomaraswamy, homage)
- Pourquoi j'illustre Les Pensées de Pascal, Arts, 24 March 1950, p. 1–2
- Introduction au catalogue de l'exposition Les Pensées de Pascal, Chapelle de l’Oratoire, Avignon, 22 July – 31 August 1950
- Peinture d’Opinion et Peinture de Métier, L’Atelier de la Rose, Lyon, June 1951
- Réflexions sur l’Art dit Abstrait et du Caractère de l’Image dans la Non-Figuration, I, L’Atelier de la Rose, Lyon, October 1951
- Réflexions sur l’Art dit Abstrait et du Caractère de l’Image dans la Non-Figuration, II, L’Atelier de la Rose, Lyon, January 1952
- L’Esprit fondamental de l’Art roman, L’Atelier de la Rose, Lyon, September 1952
- Mentalité Renouvelée, I, L’Atelier de la Rose, Lyon, December 1952
- Présence d’Albert Gleizes, Zodiaque, Saint-Léger-Vauban, no. 6–7, January 1952
- L’Esprit de ma fresque : L’Eucharistie, L’Atelier de la Rose, Lyon, March 1953.
- Mentalité Renouvelée, Il, L’Atelier de la Rose, Lyon, June 1953, pp. 452–460.
- Conformisme, Réforme et Révolution, Correspondences, Tunis, no. 2, 1954, p. 39–45. (With a biographical note by Jean Cathelin)
- Un potier [sur Anne Dangar ], La belle Journée est passée, Zodiaque, Saint-Léger-Vauban, no. 25, April 1955.
- Caractères de l’Art Celtique, Actualité de l’Art Celtique, Cahiers d’Histoire et de Folklore, Lyon, 1956, pp. 55–97 (extraits de La Forme et l’Histoire, 1932)
- Souvenirs, le Cubisme 1908–1914, Lyon, Cahiers Albert Gleizes, L’Association des Amis d’Albert Gleizes, 1957 (from Souvenirs, manuscript conserved at the Kandinsky Library / Centre Pompidou, Paris)
- Introduction à Mainie Jellett, The Artists’ Vision, Dundalk, Dundalgan Press, 1958, pp. 25–45 (written in 1948)
- Puissances du Cubisme, Chambéry, éditions Présence, 1969 (articles published between 1925 and 1946)
- Art et religion, Art et science, Art et production, Chambéry, éditions Présence, 1970. (English edition by Peter Brooke, 1999)
- Fragments de notes inédites (1946), Zodiaque, n° 100, April 1974, pp. 39–74
- Du Cubisme, Jean Metzinger, Aubard (éditions Présence), 1980 (re-edition of the 1947 version with an introduction by Daniel Robbins)
- Albert Gleizes en 1934, Ampuis, Association des Amis d'Albert Gleizes, 1991. (from Souvenirs, manuscript conserved at the Kandinsky Library / Centre Pompidou, Paris)
- Sujet et objet, deux lettres adressées à André Lhote, Ampuis, Association des Amis d’Albert Gleizes, 1996

== Museum collections ==
- Centre Pompidou – Musée National d'Art Moderne, Paris Archived 2019-08-20 at the Wayback Machine
- Art Institute of Chicago
- Dallas Museum of Art, Texas
- Guggenheim Museum, New York City, Collection online, Albert Gleizes
- Peggy Guggenheim Collection, Venice Archived 2019-03-06 at the Wayback Machine
- Metropolitan Museum of Art, New York City
- Museum of Modern Art, New York City
- Albright-Knox Art Gallery, Buffalo, New york
- Art Gallery of New South Wales, Sydney, Australia Archived 2020-05-27 at the Wayback Machine
- Chazen Museum of Art at the University of Wisconsin
- Cleveland Museum of Art, Ohio
- Indiana University Art Museum, Bloomington – Provenance Research Project
- Indianapolis Museum of Art, Indiana
- Los Angeles County Museum of Art Database (LACMA)
- McMullen Museum of Art at Boston College, Massachusetts
- Minneapolis Institute of Arts, Minnesota
- National Gallery of Victoria, Melbourne, Australia
- National Museum of Western Art, Tokyo
- Philadelphia Museum of Art
- Musée Carnolès, Menton
- Museum Moderner Kunst Stiftung Ludwig (mumok), Vienna
- Israël Museum, Jerusalem, Landscape: Pyrénées and Seated Woman
- Reina Sofía National Museum, Madrid (in Spanish)
- Musée Calvet, Musée des Beaux-Arts et d'Archéologie d'Avignon
- Tate Gallery, London, UK
- Thyssen-Bornemisza Museum, Madrid
- University of Iowa Museum of Art, Iowa City

== See also ==
- The Cubist Painters, Aesthetic Meditations
- Crystal Cubism
- Anne Dangar
- Mainie Jellett
- Andrée Le Coultre
- Blanche Lazzell

== References and sources ==
Sources

- Albert Gleizes and Jean Metzinger: Du "Cubisme". An English translation is available, together with other writings of Gleizes from the pre-war period, in Mark Antliff and Patricia Leighten (ed): A Cubism Reader – Documents and Criticism, 1906–1914, University of Chicago Press, 2008.
- Hourcade, Olivier. Courrier des Arts. Paris-Journal. 10–30 Oct. 1912
- Les Beaux-Arts. August 1938
- Gray, Cleve. Gleizes. Magazine of Art. vol. 43, no. 6, October 1950
- Golding, John. Cubism: A History and an Analysis 1907–1914. New York/London, 1959
- Robbins, Daniel. Albert Gleizes 1881 – 1953, A Retrospective Exhibition, Published by The Solomon R. Guggenheim Foundation, New York, in collaboration with Musée National d'Art Moderne, Paris, Museum am Ostwall, Dortmund, 1964
- Kuh, Katharine. Albert Gleizes: Underrated Cubist. Saturday Review. 31 October 1964
- Robbins, Daniel. Gleizes as a Way of Life. Art News. No. 63, September 1964
- West, Richard V. Painters of Section d'Or: The Alternatives to Cubism (exh. cat.). Albright-Knox Art Gallery, Buffaro, 1967
- Golding, John. Cubism: A History and an Analysis 1907–1914. 2nd ed., London, 1968
- Cooper, Douglas. The Cubist Epoch. New York, 1970
- Robbins, Daniel. The Formation and Maturity of Albert Gleizes, 1881 through 1920. Dissertation, New York University, 1975
- Alexandrian, Sarane. Panorama du Cubisme. Paris, 1976
- Rudenstine, Angelica Zander. The Guggenheim Museum Collection: paintings, 1880–1945. vol. 1, New York, 1976
- Yaegashi, Haruki. Sekai no Bijutsu. Cubism. Vol. 63, Tokyo, Jun. 1979
- Yaegashi, Haruki. Kindai no Bijutsu. Cubism. Vol.56, Tokyo, 1980
- Daix, Pierre. Journal du Cubisme. Geneve, 1982
- Alibert, Pierre. Albert Gleizes: Naissance et avenir du cubisme. Saint-Étienne, 1982
- Cottington, David. Cubism and the Politics of Culture in France 1905–1914. Dissertation, Courtauld Institute of Art, University of London, 1985
- Green, Christopher. Cubism and its Enemies: Modern Movements and Reaction in French Art, 1916–1928. Yale University Press, 1987
- Golding, John. Cubism: A History and an Analysis 1907–1914. 3rd ed., Cambridge, MA, 1988
- Gersh-Nesic, Beth S. The Early Criticism of André Salmon, A Study of His Thought on Cubism. Dissertation, City University of New York, 1989
- Alibert, Pierre. Gleizes, galerie Michèle Heyraud, Paris, 1990
- Antliff, Mark. Inventing Bergson: Cultural Politics and the Parisian Avant-Garde. Princeton, 1993
- Franscina, Francis and Harrison, Charles. Realism and Ideology: An Introduction to Semiotics and Cubism. Primitivism, Cubism, Abstraction: The Early Twentieth Century. Chapter 2, New Haven/ London, 1993
- Gleizes, Albert. L'Homme devenu peintre, preface by Alain Tapié, Paris, SOMOGY éditions d'art/Fondation Albert Gleizes, 1998, ISBN 2-85056-325-0. Written in 1948, Gleizes's last book-length writing which may be read as his testament.
- Varichon, Anne. Albert Gleizes – Catalogue Raisonné, 2 vols, Paris, SOMOGY éditions d'art/Fondation Albert Gleizes, 1998, ISBN 2-85056-286-6. Indispensable work of reference.
- Massent, Michel. Albert Gleizes, Paris, SOMOGY éditions d'art/Fondation Albert Gleizes/Fondation Albert Gleizes, 1998, ISBN 2-85056-341-2. Personal reflections by a distinguished French writer and former President of the Fondation Albert Gleizes, Paris, 1998
- Cottington, David. Cubism in the Shadow of War: The Avant-garde and Politics in Paris, 1905–1914. New Haven/London, 1998
- Gleizes, Albert. Art and Religion, Art and Science, Art and Production, translation, introduction and notes by Peter Brooke, London, Francis Boutle publishers, 1999, ISBN 0-9532388-5-7. Talks given in the 1930s reflecting Gleizes's mature views on the relations of Cubism to other aspects of our intellectual and moral life.
- Cox, Neil. Cubism. London, 2000
- Green, Christopher. Art in France 1900–1940. New Haven/ London, 2000
- Briend, Christian. Albert Gleizes au Salon de la Section d'Or de 1912. La Section d'or 1912, 1920, 1925 (exh. cat.). Paris, 2000
- Hourcade, Olivier. Courrier des Arts (reprint). La Section d'or 1912, 1920, 1925 (exh. cat.). Musées de Châteauroux/Musés Fabre, Montpellier, Édition Cercle d'Art, 2000–2001
- Antliff, Mark; Leighten, Patricia. Cubism and Culture. London/New York, 2001
- Brooke, Peter. Albert Gleizes – For and Against the Twentieth Century, New Haven and London, Yale University Press, 2001, ISBN 0-300-08964-3
- Briend, Christian; Brooke, Peter et al. Albert Gleizes: Le cubisme en majesté (exh. cat.). Museu Picasso, Barcelona/Musée des Beaux-Arts, Lyon, 2001
- Gleizes, Albert. Painting and its laws, (with Gino Severini: From Cubism to Classicism), translation, introduction and notes by Peter Brooke, London, Francis Boutle publishers, 2001, ISBN 1-903427-05-3. Originally published in 1923–4. The key text in which Gleizes formulated the technique of 'translation' and 'rotation' as the permanent acquisition of Cubism.
- Briend, Christian. Between Tradition and Modernity: The Cubist Work of Albert Gleizes. Albert Gleizes: Cubism in Magesty (exh. cat.). Centro Cultural de Belém, Lisbon, 2002–2003
- Cox, Neil. Cubism. Tokyo, 2003 (Japanese Translation.)
- Cottington, David. Cubism and its Histories. Manchester/ New York, 2004
- Annual bulletin of the National Museum of Western Art. No. 39 (Apr. 2004-Mar. 2005), 2006, Tanaka, Masayuki. New Acquisitions.
- Kuspit, Donald. A Critical History of 20th-Century Art, Chapter 2, Part 4 – The machine and spirituality in the avant-gardes, 2006
- Walter Robinson, Walter and Davis, Ben. The 2008 Revue. "Fly high, fall hard," a motto for the times, 2008
- Kuspit, Donald. At the Philadelphia Museum, "Marc Chagall and His Circle" raises questions of modernism, traditionalism and idealism in a harsh world, 2011
