= Woman with Phlox =

Painting by Albert Gleizes

- La Femme aux Phlox (French)
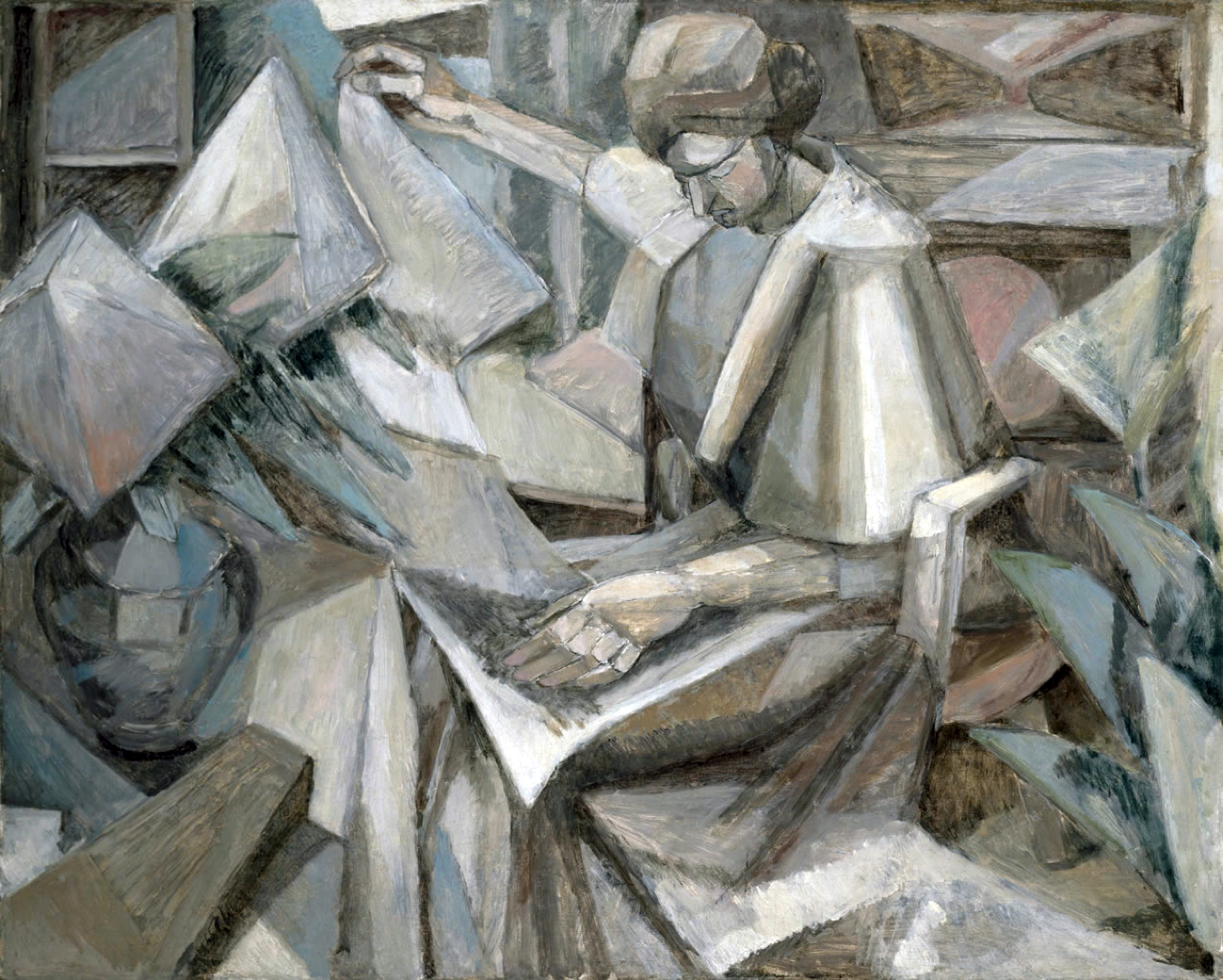
- Artist: Albert Gleizes
- Year: 1910
- Medium: Oil on canvas
- Dimensions: 81.6 cm × 100.2 cm (32.1 in × 39.4 in)
- Location: Museum of Fine Arts, Houston; Houston

Woman with Phlox (French: La Femme aux Phlox) is an oil painting created in 1910 by the French artist Albert Gleizes. The painting was exhibited in Room 41 at the Salon des Indépendants in the Spring of 1911 (no. 2612); the exhibition that introduced Cubism as a group manifestation to the general public for the first time. The complex collection of geometric masses in restrained colors exhibited in Room 41 created a scandal from which Cubism spread throughout Paris, France, Europe and the rest of the world. It was from the preview of the works by Gleizes, Jean Metzinger, Henri Le Fauconnier, Robert Delaunay, and Fernand Léger at the 1911 Indépendants that the term 'Cubism' can be dated. La Femme aux Phlox was again exhibited the following year at the Salon de la Section d'Or, Galerie La Boétie, 1912 (no. 35). La Femme aux Phlox was reproduced in The Cubist Painters, Aesthetic Meditations (Les Peintres Cubistes) by Guillaume Apollinaire, published in 1913. The same year, the painting was again revealed to the general public, this time in the United States, at the International Exhibition of Modern Art (The Armory Show), New York, Chicago, and Boston (no. 195). The work is now in the Museum of Fine Arts, Houston, Gift of the Esther Florence Whinery Goodrich Foundation in 1965.

== Description ==
La Femme aux Phlox is an oil on canvas with dimensions 81.6 x 100.2 cm (32.1 by 39.4 inches) signed and dated 'Alb Gleizes 10'. Created during the second half of 1910, the painting represents a woman sitting in an interior setting, with a vase of flowers (phloxes) in front and another to her left. The window behind the sitter opens out onto an exterior scene, the whole blurring the distinction between interior and exterior.

In 1964 art historian Daniel Robbins writes of La Femme aux Phlox in the catalogue of the Gleizes Retrospective at the New York Guggenheim:

Continuing his new interest in the figure, Gleizes strove to manipulate a genre subject with the same sobriety and broad scale that had always informed his landscapes. Thus, exterior nature is here brought into a room and the distant vista seen through the window is formally resolved with a corresponding interior shape.

Gleizes had sketched figures often enough, but because his search for a synthetic vision that would reconcile disparate elements had fostered a natural predilection for landscape, his figure paintings were few. The Salon des Indepéndants, 1910, saw the immediate influence of Le Fauconnier in Gleizes' large portrait of René Arcos.

In 1910 both artists continued to concentrate on figures: Le Fauconnier on a portrait of the poet Paul Castiaux and Gleizes on a majestic portrait of his uncle, Robert Gleizes. The two works are very close and establish Gleizes' debt to Le Fauconnier for having stimulated his interest to encompas a new and important element, the figure.

With its highly limited color palette Gleizes achieved in La Femme aux Phlox a masterful demonstration of monochromism, a relative and paradoxical monochromy, considering the subject matter of a woman with flowers.

The subject of Gleizes entries at the 1911 Indépendants are discernible to some extent and to some viewers, while it was claimed that others could see nothing. For Gleizes, the subject (the 'figurative support') is used only as an accessory, hidden under other values that are more specifically important. Gleizes writes in his Souvenirs:

The subject—whether treated sentimentally or adapted to the formula of a gimmick that might be more or less amusing—the originality of a Henner, a Ziem, a Didier-Pouget, even of a Wlaminck—was subordinated to true, essential qualities that correspond to the plastic demands of painting; that certainly was the basis for the state of mind of this first stage in a radical change in the position of the painter, the stage that has, legitimately, the right to the name 'Cubism'. This stage in fact remains respectful of the classical 'three dimensions', emphasising 'volume'. Consequently, it remains within the framework of 'perspective', which suggests on a flat surface an illusion of depth. These are the values which we wanted forcefully to express and to place above those purely emotional concerns with which the mentality of painters of that time was satisfied, leading to a real atrophying of the form which other times had, by contrast, been able to develop and to exalt. (Gleizes, Souvenirs)

== Salon des Indépendants, 1911 ==
=== 1911, the major scandal of Cubism ===
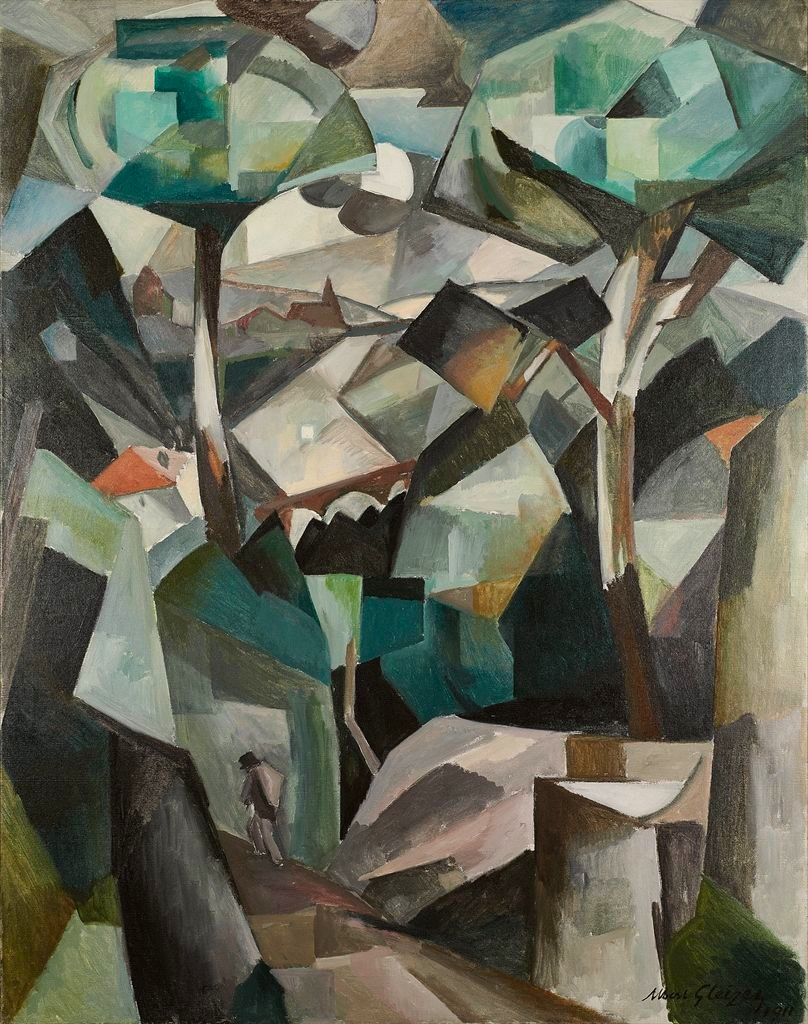
Albert Gleizes, 1911, Le Chemin, Paysage à Meudon, Paysage avec personnage, oil on canvas, 146.4 x 114.4 cm. Exhibited at Salon des Indépendants, 1911. Stolen by Nazi occupiers from the home of collector Alphonse Kann during World War II, returned to its rightful owners in 1997

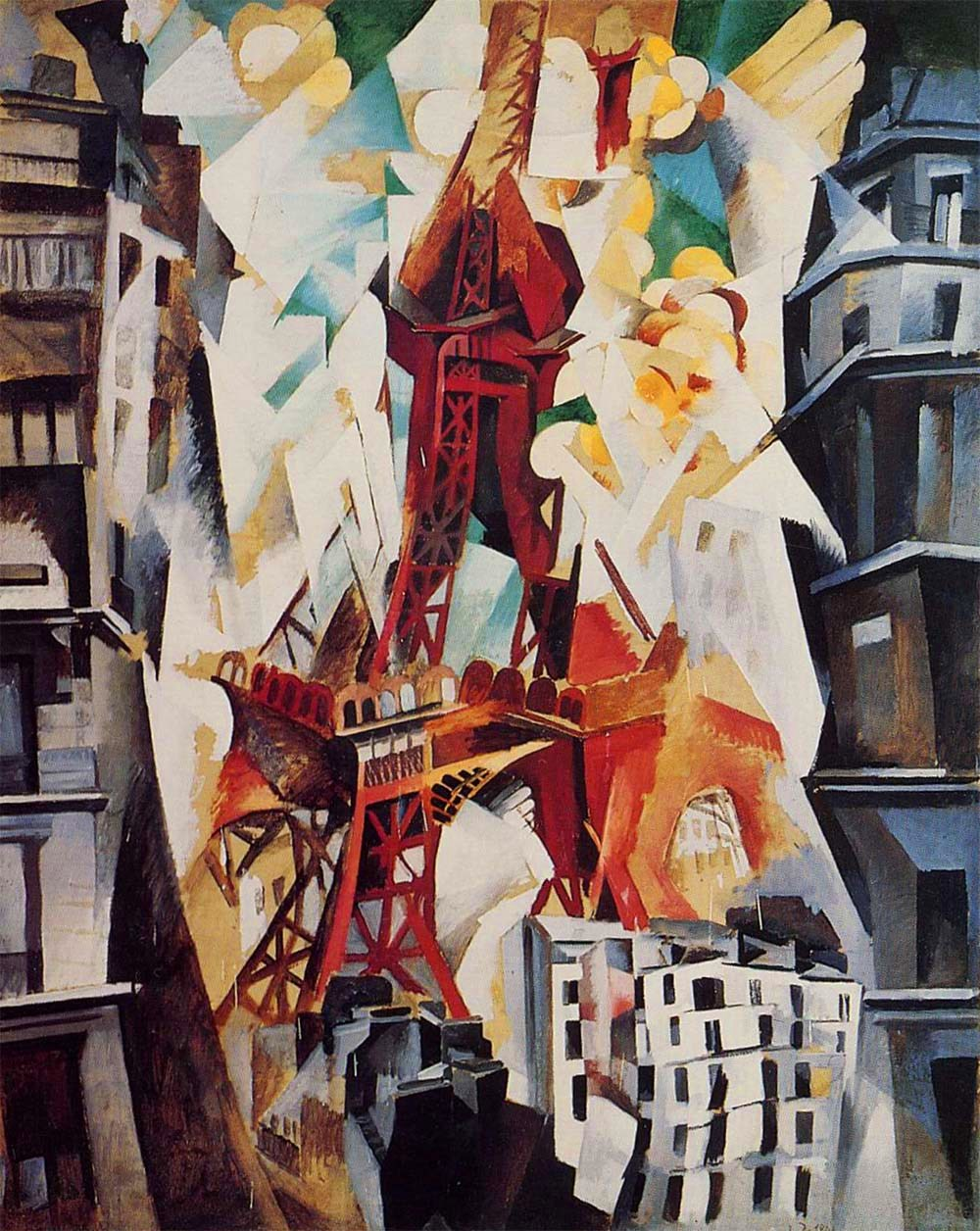
Champs de Mars. La Tour rouge. 1911 by Robert Delaunay in his Eiffel Tower series. Art Institute of Chicago. Exhibited at Salon des Indépendants, 1911

This exhibition comprised more than 6,400 artworks. In room 41 were placed the works by Gleizes, Léger, Metzinger, Delaunay, Le Fauconnier, Archipenko and Laurencin. In room 43 hung works by André Lhote, Roger de La Fresnaye, André Dunoyer de Segonzac, Luc-Albert Moreau and André Mare. In room 42 was a retrospective exhibition of Henri (Le Douanier) Rousseau, who died 2 September 1910.

The Cubist contribution to the salon created a controversy in the French Parliament about the use of public funds to provide the venue for such 'barbaric art'. Gleizes was a founder of Cubism, and demonstrates the principles of the movement in this monumental painting (over six feet tall) with its projecting planes and fragmented lines. The large size of the painting reflects Gleizes's ambition to show it in the large annual salon exhibitions in Paris, where he was able with others of his entourage to bring Cubism to wider audiences.

The newly formed group who held meetings not just at Le Fauconnier's studio, but at the cafés Le Dôme, La Coupole, La Closerie des Lilas, Le Select, and Café de la Rotonde) together with other young painters who also wanted to emphasize a research into form (as opposed to color) took over the hanging committee of the Salon des Indépendants ensuring that the works of painters soon to be dubbed 'Cubists' would be shown together. Gleizes, Metzinger, Le Fauconnier, Delaunay, Léger and Marie Laurencin (at the request of Apollinaire) were shown together in Room 41.

Albert Gleizes, in his Souvenirs, writes of the importance of taking over the hanging commission of the 1911 Indépendants, so that the works of like-minded artists could be hung together forming a coherent group, i.e., so as not to be scattered to the four corners of the salon where the effect produced on the public by a coherent movement would be lost. The task was difficult. To achieve this, they needed to get into a position of influence. After some political maneuvering and a forceful 'last minute thrust' ['manoeuvre de dernière heure'] they succeeded in battering their way through the Committee's routine. Le Fauconnier was unanimously elected as chairman, Gleizes continues:

So we could get down to business. We divided the exhibitors in two, those who were headed by Signac and Luce, the other made up of artists of the new generation. On one side of the central room the rooms would be given to the older members; on the other, the young painters organised the rooms that had been given to them. For our part, we took Room 41. In the following rooms, André Lhote, Segonzac, La Fresnaye etc. would take their place. It was at this moment that we got to know each other.

In the Room 41 we were grouped together – Le Fauconnier, Léger, Delaunay, Metzinger and myself, joined, at the insistence of Guillaume Apollinaire, who was following this organisation with the greatest interest, by Marie Laurencin

Le Fauconnier showed his great Abondance. Léger his nudes in a landscape in which volumes were treated following the method of differently shaded areas [zones dégradées] used in architecture or in mechanical models. Delaunay Le Tour Eiffel and La Ville. Metzinger [Landscape, Nude, Woman's Head and Still Life], Marie Laurencin some canvasses with people in them. Myself – two landscapes and two canvasses with people: La Femme au phlox and Homme nu sortant du bain.

That, very precisely, was how Room 41 in the 1911 Indépendants was made up. In the neighbouring room were to be found, if my memory is right, Lhote, Segonzac, Moreau. [...]

During the few days it took for the hanging commission to do its work, there was nothing that could have enabled us to foresee the effect our pictures were about to produce on the public at large. The painters and critics who walked around the canvasses were clearly very interested, whether they were for or against. But no-one could have thought there was material there for a scandal. And we the first, who certainly never would have wanted it.

So we were greatly surprised when, at the preview, the explosion took place. (Albert Gleizes)

"The great complaint that was made against us was of being unreadable; people claimed they could 'see' nothing in our pictures". Gleizes continues:

Everyone was crushed into our room, people were shouting or laughing, expressing indignation, protesting, getting up to all sorts of antics, they were pushing each other out of the way to get in, those who approved and defended our position and those who condemned it argued with each other... Room 41 was always full.

In Intransigeant Guillaume Apollinaire emphasized the importance of what the Cubists were doing and defended them with passion. Louis Vauxcelles in Gil Blas attacked them with a violence that was quite extraordinary. Younger critics who wrote columns in Comoedia, Excelsior, Action, and L'Oeuvre were more reserved, some of them even welcomed the Cubists with sympathy; in Paris-Journal, the free spirited poet André Salmon wrote an account of Room 41 that was full of intelligence and sympathy. The most important thing for Gleizes was that the younger generation of critics had been won over by Cubism.

=== The term 'Cubism' ===
It was from that preview in 1911 that the term 'Cubism' can be dated. Prior to the Salon des Indépendants of 1911 no one had ever been called a Cubist, not even Braque or Picasso.

What, by contrast, can be established is that from 1911 onwards the term became commonplace and, initially confined as it was to the painters of Room 41, it was afterwards attributed to those who seemed, nearly or at a distance, to approach them, in appearance if not in spirit. Apollinaire himself was initially reticent about this label and it was not until later, after this opening at the Indépendants, during an exhibition which we held at Brussels, that he accepted definitively on his own and our behalf, the name 'Cubist' by which all sorts of people had designated us in irony. In 1911 the word Cubism was born in the same way as the word 'Impressionism' in 1872.

Overnight, Gleizes, Metzinger, Léger and Delaunay had become famous. Virtually unknown the previous evening, their names and profiles were spread not only throughout Paris but throughout France and other countries as well. Gleizes writes:

Painting which, until then, had been the concern of only a small handful of amateurs, passed into the public domain and everyone wanted to be informed, to be let into the secret of those paintings which, it seemed, represented nothing, and whose meaning had to be deciphered like a puzzle.

== The Armory Show ==
The International Exhibition of Modern Art of 1913, known today as the Armory Show, was a landmark event in the history of art. This monumental series of exhibitions showcased the works of the most radical European artists of their time alongside those of progressive American contemporaries. This massive exhibition was presented in varying forms at three venues—New York (69th Regiment Armory, February 17 – March 15), Chicago (Art Institute of Chicago, March 24 – April 16), and Boston (Copley Society, April 23 – May 14). The exhibition introduced the visual language of European modernism to a wide spectrum of the American public, changing the aesthetic outlook for American artists, collectors, critics, galleries and museums.

In 1913, Gleizes, along with Archipenko, Picabia, Picasso, the Duchamp brothers and others, introduced Cubism to an American audience at the Armory Show in three major cities, New York City, Chicago and Boston. In addition to La Femme aux Phlox Gleizes exhibited his 1912 painting Man on a balcony (no. 196 of the catalogue).

Gleizes entries—both of particular importance, had already produced a considerable effect in Paris—practically eclipsed six paintings and a drawing by Picasso, and three paintings by Braque exhibited at the Armory Show.

== See also ==
- List of works by Albert Gleizes

== Exhibitions ==
- Salon des Indépendants, Paris, 1911, no. 2612.
- Salon de la Section d'Or, Paris, 1912, no. 35.
- International Exhibition of Modern Art (The Armory Show), New York, Chicago, Boston, 1913, no. 195.
- Rene Gimpel Galerie, New York, 1937, no. 5.
- Passedoit Gallery, New York, 1949, no. 4.
- Le Cubisme, Musée National d'Art Moderne, Paris, 1953, no. 37.
- Twentieth Century Masters, Marlborough Gallery, London, 1955, no. 21.
- Albert Gleizes, Marlborough Gallery, London, 1956, no. 8.
- Marlborough-Gerson Gallery, New York, 1964
- Albert Gleizes 1881–1953, a retrospective exhibition, The Solomon R. Guggenheim Museum, New York. This exhibition traveled to the Musée national d'art moderne, Paris; Museum am Ostwall, Dortmund, 1964–65, no.21

== Literature ==
- Cubism and Its Histories, David Cottington – 2004
- Cubism, Guillaume Apollinaire, Dorothea Eimert, Anatoli Podoksik – 2010
- The Cubist Painters, Guillaume Apollinaire, Peter F. Read – 2004
- Theories of Modern Art: A Source Book by Artists and Critics, Herschel Browning Chipp, Peter Howard Selz – 1968
- The Cubist Epoch, Douglas Cooper – 1971
- Movement, Manifesto, Melee: The Modernist Group, 1910–1914, Milton A. Cohen – 2004
- The Museum of Fine Arts, Houston: a guide to the collection, 1981
- Albert Gleizes, 1881–1953: A Retrospective Exhibition, Solomon R. Guggenheim Museum, Daniel Robbins – 1964
- Transatlantic Modernism, Martin Klepper, Joseph C. Schöpp – 2001
- Bulletin, Houston, Texas. Museum of Fine Arts – 1970
- Magazine of art, American Federation of Arts, Gray, C., – 1950
- Albert Gleizes: For and Against the Twentieth Century, Peter Brooke – 2001
- Painters of the Section d'or: the alternatives to cubism, Richard V. West, Albright-Knox Art Gallery – 1967
- Art of the avant-gardes, edited by Steve Edwards and Paul Wood – 2004
- Modernism: an anthology of sources and documents, Vassiliki Kolocotroni, Jane Goldman, Olga Taxidou – 1998
- Abstraction, Non-objectivity, Realism: Twentieth-century Painting, Dewey F. Mosby, Vivian Endicott Barnett – 1987
- Toward modern art: from Puvis de Chavannes to Matisse and Picasso, Serge Lemoine, Palazzo Grassi – 2002
- Cubism in the Shadow of the War – the avant-garde and politics in Paris, 1905–1914, David Cottington – 1998
- Cubism (Le Cubisme), José Pierre – 1966, 1969
- Twentieth Century Painters: Nabis, Fauves, Cubists, Bernard Dorival – 1958
- Cubism, Edward F. Fry – 1966
- World Painting Index: First Supplement 1973–1980: Volume I, Patricia Pate Havlice – 1982
- The avant-garde in exhibition: new art in the 20th century, Bruce Altshuler – 1994
- Apollinaire on art: essays and reviews, 1902–1918, Guillaume Apollinaire, LeRoy C. Breunig – 2001
- 1912, Breakup of Tradition, Louise d'Argencourt, Winnipeg Art Gallery – 1987
- Jean Metzinger in retrospect, Joann Moser, Daniel Robbins – 1985
- The nature of art, John Gassner, Sidney Thomas – 1964
- T.S. Eliot's Parisian year, Nancy Duvall Hargrove – 2009
- Mondrian, 1892–1914: the path to abstraction : catalogue, Hans Janssen, Piet Mondrian, Joop M. Joosten – 2002
- Time & Tide, 1955
- Five hundred years of French art, Richard R. Brettell, James Clifton, Douglas Hyland – 1995
- The Story of the Armory Show, Milton Wolf Brown – 1988
- World painting index: 3. Supplement 1990–1999; Vol. 2, Patricia P. Havlice – 2003
- Alexandra Exter: monographie, Jean Chauvelin, Nadia Filatoff, John E. Bowlt – 2003
- Cubism, Neil Cox – 2000
- French News: Theatre and arts, 1966
- Pablo Picasso: His Life and Times, Pierre Cabanne – 1977
- The twentieth century, 1914–1964, Arthur P. Mendel – 1968
- The cubist spirit in its time: catalogue of the exhibition, London Gallery ltd – 1947 – 39 pages
- Guillaume Apollinaire as an Art Critic, Harry E. Buckley – 1969
- Saur allgemeines Künstler-Lexikon, K.G. Saur Verlag – 2000
- Albert Gleizes: 1881–1953, Michel Massenet – 1998
- Albert Gleizes: Catalogue raisonné, Daniel Robbins, Anne Varichon, Volume 1, Somogy Edition d'Art, Paris – 1998
- Albert Gleizes et tempête dans les Salons, 1910–1914, Musée de Grenoble – 1963
- La Section d'or, 1912-1920-1925, Cécile Debray, Françoise Lucbert, Musées de Châteauroux – 2000
- L'Oeil, Georges Bernier, Rosamond Bernier – 1992
- Cahiers du Musée national d'art moderne – 1981
- La collection du Musée national d'art moderne: catalogue, Musée national d'art moderne (France). Conservation, Agnès Angliviel de La Beaumelle, Nadine Pouillon – 1987
- Albert Gleizes et le dessin: 11 décembre 1970-25 janvier 1971, André Dubois, Saint-Étienne (Loire, France). Musée d'art et d'industrie – 1970
- Au temps des cubistes: 1910–1920, Anisabelle Berès, Galerie Berès – 2006
- Vingtième siècle: revue d'histoire – 2002
- Histoire de l'art: Du réalisme à nos jours, Pierre Devambez, Jean Babelon – 1961
- Le Siècle de Picasso: L'époque des métamorphoses (1912–1937), Pierre Cabanne – 1975, 1992
- Le cubisme, 1907–1914: Exposition 30 janvier-9 avril, 1953, Musée national d'art moderne (France), Jean Cassou, Gabrielle Vienne – 1953
- Le Cubisme, Guillaume Apollinaire, L'Intermédiaire des chercheurs et curieux, vol. LXVI, nº 1342, 10 October 1912
- Geschichte der Kunst aller Zeiten und Völker, Karl Woermann – 1927
- Bilan du cubisme, François Fosca – 1956 – 179 pages
- Littérature et peinture en France: du XVIIe au XXe siècle, Louis Hautecœur – 1963
- Acerca Del Purismo: Escritos, 1918–1926, Amédée Ozenfant, Le Corbusier, Antonio Pizza – 1994
- Inédits secrets, Blaise Cendrars, Miriam Cendrars – 1969
- Quadrum: revue internationale d'art moderne..., 1957
- Cubism: a History and an Analysis: 1907 – 1914, John Golding – 1959
- 1880–1920, René Huyghe, Jean Rudel – 1970
- Diaboliques au divan, Jean Bellemin-Noël – 1991
- El siglo de Picasso: El nacimiento del Cubismo, 1881–1912 −1982
- Regards de critiques d'art: autour de Roger Marx, 1859–1913, Catherine Méneux, Institut national d'histoire de l'art (France) – 2008
- Presenza Di Max Jacob in Italia: Da "Lacerba" a "900" (1913–1927), Jean François Rodriguez – 1996
- Œil, Georges Bernier, Rosamond Bernier – 1959
- L'Avant-garde au XXe siècle, Pierre Cabanne, Pierre Restany – 1969
- Le siècle de Picasso: La naissance du cubisme (1881–1912), Pierre Cabanne – 1992
- L'aventure futuriste, 1909–1916, Fanette Roche-Pézard – 1983
- The 1913 Armory Show in Retrospect, Frank Trapp – 1958
