= The Spanish Dancers =

Painting by Marie Laurencin

The Spanish Dancers (French: Danseuses Espagnoles) was a piece created in 1921 by Cubist artist Marie Laurencin.

== Background ==
While in Spain she was homesick, unhappy and did very little work. She had also recently ended her long-term relationship with Cubist art critique Guillaume Apollinaire (1907–1912) and married German artist Baron Otto von Waëtjen. Thus freeing Laurencin of Cubist influence, but isolating herself in the process. By marrying a foreign German she had forfeited her French citizenship making her feel alone and exiled from her own country. Despite her exiled sentiments while in Spain, upon returning to Paris in 1921 she felt some nostalgia for her adopted Spanish culture. After only a year of marriage, Waëtjen and Laurencin divorced and she returned to Paris where she created The Spanish Dancers.

== Painting ==
The Spanish Dancers features three women in the foreground of the painting. The woman standing to the far left is wearing a light blue dress. While the woman in the center is kneeling wearing a pink ballerina dress, as the woman to the far right is hunched down and is wearing a light grey dress with a light blue headscarf. The background of the composition is a dark grey and contrasts the light colors of the three women's skin and clothing. And upon closer inspection, you can see there is the head of a horse and a dog overlapping within the image.

Laurencin also adopts a completely new and mature style after she returns from Spain. No longer was she painting in strictly soft and feminine tones with delicate and soft pastel palettes. Instead she developed a darker style incorporating greys, blues and pinks. However, her female subjects remains the same. But there is something more expressive and dynamic about The Spanish Dancers compared to the rest of her work. The faces of the women have more shadow and depth. While the background is dark and sharply contrasts her earlier work of delicate interior scenes. The angularity of the figures and their dynamic body poses move the eye through the composition and create a sense of dimension that is often lacking in many of her other works.

== Cubist influence ==
There is an influence from Cubism that did not exist before her time in Spain. The lines of her figures and the angles that outline the composition are all classic Cubist troupes. The new contrasting color scheme is also a technique found in Cubism and is reminiscent of Picasso’s blue period. Also, the noticeable use of shading and shadow in the background and on the figures faces is also a technique influenced by Cubism. The work is also a “Parisian” depiction of Spanish dancers. The women are very aristocratic with ambiguous expressions that are difficult to interpret. These characters are a part of the feminine and decorative images Laurencin creates but in a new and elevated style. Yet, this unique style Laurencin developed after her time in Spain is short-lived. And is promptly followed by a stylistic shift that incorporates the more refined style of The Spanish Dancers and her usual feminine portraits.
