= The Cubist Painters, Aesthetic Meditations =

Book by Guillaume Apollinaire

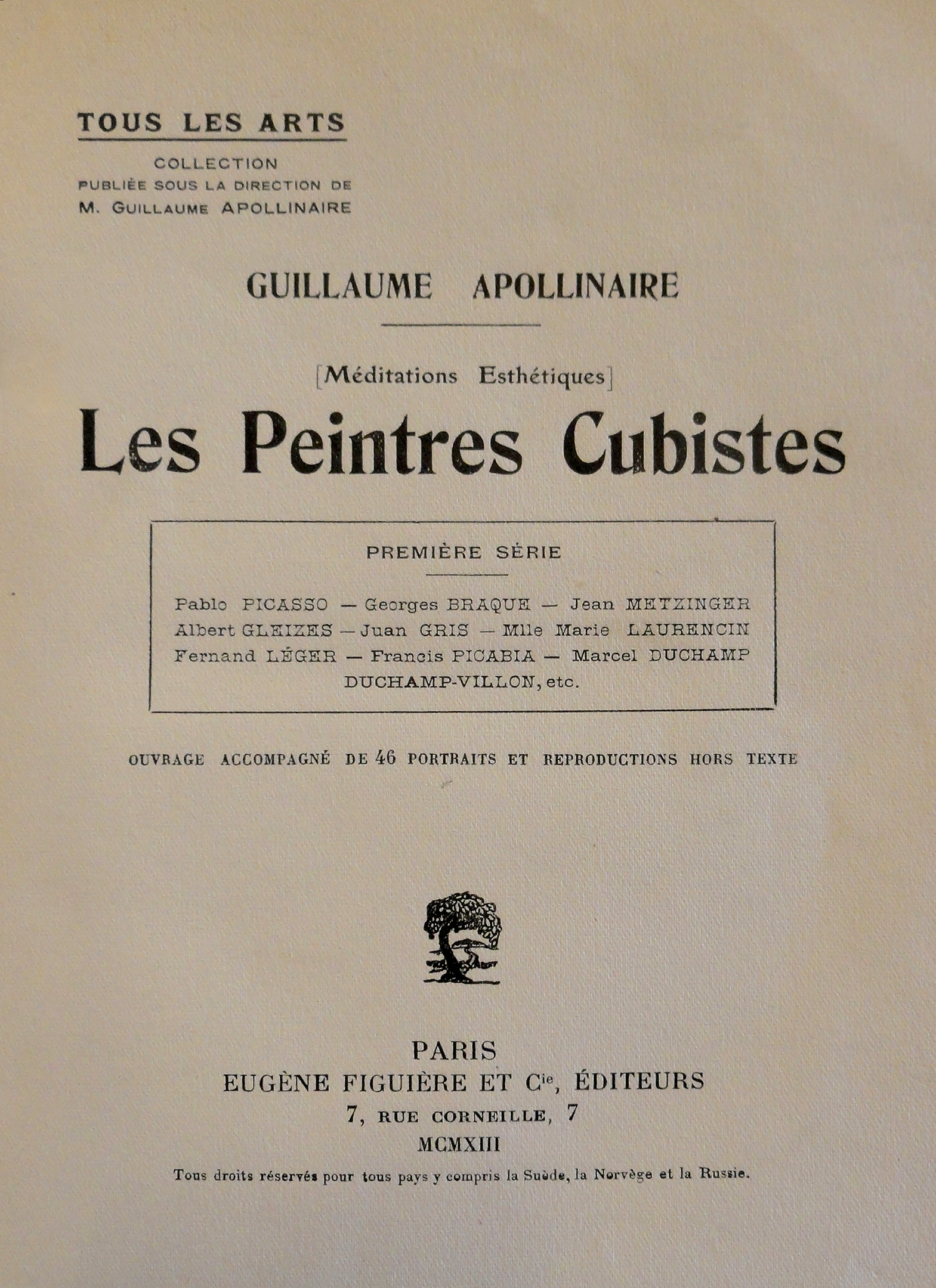
Guillaume Apollinaire, Les Peintres Cubistes, Méditations Esthétiques (The Cubist Painters, Aesthetic Meditations), published by Eugène Figuière Éditeurs, Collection "Tous les Arts", Paris, 1913 (cover)

Les Peintres Cubistes, Méditations Esthétiques (English, The Cubist Painters, Aesthetic Meditations), is a book written by Guillaume Apollinaire between 1905 and 1912, published in 1913. This was the third major text on Cubism; following Du "Cubisme" by Albert Gleizes and Jean Metzinger (1912); and André Salmon, Histoire anecdotique du cubisme (1912).

Les Peintres Cubistes is illustrated with black and white photographs of works by Pablo Picasso, Georges Braque, Jean Metzinger, Albert Gleizes, Juan Gris, Marie Laurencin, Fernand Léger, Francis Picabia, Marcel Duchamp and Raymond Duchamp-Villon. Also reproduced are photographs of artists Metzinger, Gleizes, Gris, Picabia and Duchamp. In total, there are 46 halftone portraits and reproductions.

Published by Eugène Figuière Éditeurs, Collection "Tous les Arts", Paris, 1913, Les Peintres Cubistes was the only independent volume of art criticism published by Apollinaire, and represented a highly original critical source on Cubism. He elucidates the history of the Cubist movement, its new aesthetic, its origins, its development, and its various features.

Marie Laurencin, 1909, Réunion à la campagne (Apollinaire et ses amis), oil on canvas, 130 x 194 cm, Musée Picasso, Paris. Alternative titles: La Noble compagnie, Le Rendez-vous des amis: Gertrude Stein, Fernande Olivier, a muse, Guillaume Apollinaire, Fricka the dog, Pablo Picasso, Marguerite Gillot, Maurice Cremnitz and Marie Laurencin.

Apollinaire first intended this book to be a general collection of his writings on art entitled Méditations Esthétiques rather than specifically on Cubism. In the fall of 1912 he revised the page proofs to include more material on the Cubist painters, adding the subtitle, Les Peintres Cubistes. When the book went to press, the original title was enclosed in brackets and reduced in size, while the subtitle Les Peintres Cubistes was enlarged, dominating the cover. Yet Les Peintres Cubistes appears only on the half t.p. and t.p. pages, while every other page has the title Méditations Esthétiques, suggesting the modification was made so late that only the title pages were reprinted.

A portion of the text was translated into English and published with several images from the original book in The Little Review: Quarterly Journal of Art and Letters, New York, Autumn 1922.

== Author ==
Guillaume Apollinaire and André Rouveyre in 1914

Guillaume Apollinaire, a French poet, playwright, short story writer, novelist, and art critic, served as a decisive interface between artists and poets of the early 20th century, joining the visual arts and literary circles. Italian by birth, Polish by name (Wilhelm Albert Włodzimierz Apolinary Kostrowicki), Parisian by choice, Apollinaire was a leading figure in early modernist poetry, a permutable figure whose work echoed the Symbolists, the Cubists and foresaw the Surrealists.

As an active figure in well-established literary journals from 1902 to his death in 1918, Apollinaire played a crucial role in the development of early modernism by founding his own artistic journals, by supporting galleries and exhibitions, as a collector of avant-garde art, and as an impassioned supporter of a diverse group of emerging artists. His pervasive influence on these artists is exemplified by a multitude of portraits of Apollinaire painted by artists such as Henri Rousseau, Pablo Picasso, Jean Metzinger, Louis Marcoussis, Amedeo Modigliani, Marie Laurencin, Marcel Duchamp, Maurice de Vlaminck, Giorgio de Chirico, Mikhail Larionov, Robert Delaunay, Marc Chagall, Pierre Savigny de Belay and Henri Matisse.

Jean Metzinger, c.1913, Le Fumeur (Man with Pipe), oil on canvas, 129.7 x 96.68 cm, Carnegie Museum of Art, Pittsburgh, Pennsylvania. Exhibited at the 1914 Salon des Indépendants, Paris. Metzinger painted several portraits of Apollinaire, 1909–10, 1911 and this work which, according to Apollinaire, is "said to be a portrait of myself".

"Apollinaire, like Baudelaire", writes Pamela A. Genova, "was a self-taught art critic, and he began his art theory naïve to the technical terminology and to the conventional precepts of the field. His work was spontaneous, impetuous, and ahead of its time, and like many avant-garde pioneers, he was often misunderstood, underestimated, or disregarded. Yet for one who began as a novice in the appreciation, analysis, and promotion of painting, the accuracy of Apollinaire's taste is uncanny, for his favorite painters [for example the artists he includes in Les Peintres Cubistes] are now considered among the most influential artists of the century".

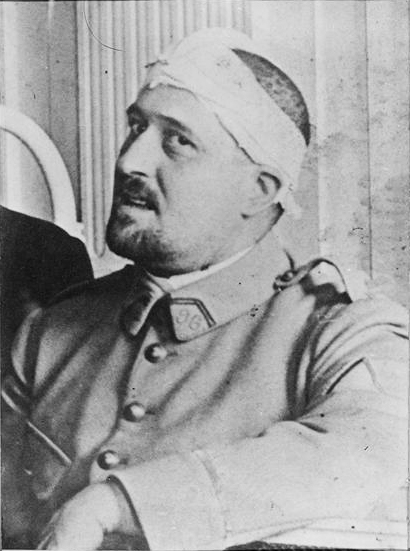
Guillaume Apollinaire during the spring of 1916 after his shrapnel wound to the temple

As a close friend of all the Cubists, and Marie Laurencin's lover, Apollinaire witnessed the development of Cubism firsthand. He was in close contact with Le Bateau-Lavoir and its habitués—including Max Jacob, Maurice Princet, Picasso, Braque and Metzinger. He was also in close contact with the Groupe de Puteaux (or Section d'Or), based in the western suburbs of Paris—including the Duchamp brothers, Gleizes, Picabia and again Metzinger (who associated with both groups early on).

Apollinaire coined several important terms of the avant-garde, such as Orphism (at the Salon de la Section d'Or in 1912) and Surrealism (concerning the ballet Parade in 1917), and was the first to adopt the term "Cubism" on behalf of his fellow artists (at the 1911 Salon des Indépendants, Brussels). He wrote about these and related movements such as Fauvism, Futurism, and Simultanism. But his most compellingly original stance can be found in Les Peintres Cubistes, in his analysis of the new art movement: "The new artists demand an ideal beauty, which will be, not merely the proud expression of the species, but the expression of the universe, to the degree that it has been humanized by light." (Les Peintres Cubistes, p. 18)

== Volume ==
Guillaume Apollinaire's only book on art, The Cubist Painters, Aesthetic Meditations is an unsystematic collection of reflections and commentaries. It was written between 1905 and 1912, and ultimately published in 1913. Composed of two parts, the volume demonstrates the poetic vision of Apollinaire. The first part, "On Painting" (Sur la peinture), is a manifesto for the new art form, consisting of seven chapters (22 pages), of which much of the text was written in 1912 and published in Les Soirées de Paris the same year.

The second and larger section of the book (53 pages), under the heading "New Painters" (Peintres nouveaux), analyzes the work of ten artists most representative of the movement in the following order: Picasso, Braque, Metzinger, Gleizes, Laurencin, Gris, Léger, Picabia, Duchamp, and in the Appendix, Duchamp-Villon. In the section on Marie Laurencin, Apollinaire included a text a Henri Rousseau, first published in a review of the 1911 Salon des Indépendants (L'Intransigéant, 10 April 1911).

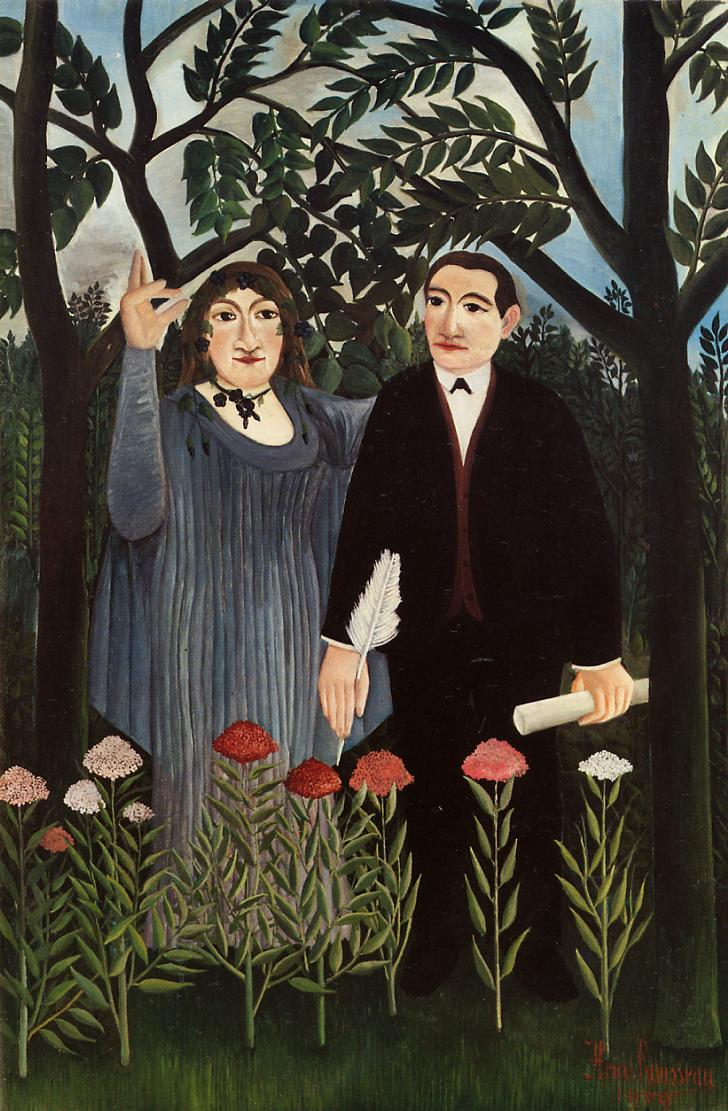
Henri Rousseau, The Muse Inspiring the Poet (La muse inspirant le poète), 1909, Kunstmuseum Basel. This work portrays Apollinaire and his muse, Marie Laurencin

Included are four reproductions of the works by each artist (with the exception of Rousseau), and portrait photographs of Metzinger, Gleizes, Gris, Picabia, and Duchamp.

A landmark in the history of art criticism, this essay synthesizes the aesthetic preoccupations of not just the Cubists, but of Apollinaire himself. The volume is valued today as a work of reference and a vintage example of creative modernist writing.

This was the third attempt to define the new pictorial trend burgeoning during the years before the First World War, following Du "Cubisme" by Albert Gleizes and Jean Metzinger, 1912, and André Salmon, Histoire anecdotique du cubisme (Anecdotal History of Cubism), 1912.

=== Classification ===
In his analysis of the new art movement, Apollinaire makes a distinction between four different types of Cubism; scientific, physical, orphic and instinctive. The first, Scientific Cubism, is the art of painting new ensembles with elements borrowed not from the reality of vision, but from the reality of knowledge. It is the tendency of 'pure' painting. The painters Apollinaire places in this category are: Picasso, Braque, Metzinger, Gleizes, Laurencin and Gris.

The second, Physical Cubism, is the discipline of constructing painting with elements borrowed mostly from the reality of vision. Its social role is well marked, but it is not a pure art. The 'physicist' who created this trend is Le Fauconnier.

Orphic Cubism is the art of painting with elements borrowed not from visual reality, but entirely created by the artist and endowed by him with a powerful reality. The works of the Orphic artists simultaneously present a pure aesthetic pleasure, a construction to the senses and a sublime meaning. This is pure art, according to Apollinaire, that includes the work of R. Delaunay, Léger, Picabia and M. Duchamp.

Instinctive Cubism is, according to Apollinaire, the art of painting elements borrowed not from visual reality, but suggestive of the artist's instinct and intuition. Instinctive Cubism includes a very large number of artists. Derived from French Impressionism, the movement spans ("is spreading") across all of Europe.

The historical study of Cubism began in the late 1920s, drawing at first from Du "Cubisme" and Apollinaire's Les Peintres Cubistes. It came to rely heavily on Daniel-Henry Kahnweiler's book Der Weg zum Kubismus (published in 1920), which centered exclusively on the developments of Picasso, Braque, Léger, and Gris. The terms "Analytical Cubism" and "Synthetic Cubism" which subsequently emerged (overshadowing Apollinaire's classification scheme) have been widely accepted since the mid-1930s. However, both terms are historical impositions that occurred after the facts they identify. Neither phase was designated as such at the time corresponding works were created. "If Kahnweiler considers Cubism as Picasso and Braque," wrote Daniel Robbins, "our only fault is in subjecting other Cubists' works to the rigors of that limited definition." This interpretation of Cubism, formulated post facto as a means of understanding the works of Braque and Picasso, is difficult to apply to other Cubist's whose art fundamentally differed from the 'Analytic' or 'Synthetic' categories, compelled Kahnweiler to question their right to be called Cubists at all. According to Robbins, "To suggest that merely because these artists developed differently or varied from the traditional pattern they deserved to be relegated to a secondary or satellite role in Cubism is a profound mistake."

Other terms have surfaced since. In his book, The Cubist Epoch, Douglas Cooper divides Cubism into three phases: "Early Cubism" (from 1906 to 1908), when the movement was initially developed in the ateliers of Picasso and Braque; "High Cubism" (from 1909 to 1914), during which time Juan Gris emerged as an important exponent (after 1911); and "Late Cubism" (from 1914 to 1921), the last phase of Cubism as a radical avant-garde movement. Cooper's restrictive use of these terms to distinguish the work of Braque, Picasso, Gris and Léger (to a lesser extent) implied an intentional value judgement, according to Christopher Green.

The current trend in the classification of Cubist styles reflects Apollinaire's wider view of the movement, more so than others. Cubism is once again no longer definitively attached to the art of a specific group or even a movement. It embraces vastly disparate work; applying to artists in different socio-cultural environments and settings. And despite the difficulties of classification, Cubism, as predicted by Apollinaire in 1913, has been called the first and the most influential of all movements in 20th-century art.

=== On Painting ===
Apollinaire stressed the importance of what he perceived as virtues of the plastic arts: purity, unity, and truth; all of which would keep "nature in subjection". He deplored the violent attacks waged against the Cubist's preoccupation with geometry; geometrical figures being the essence of drawing. "Geometry, the science of space, its dimensions and relations, has always determined the norms and rules of painting."

Before Cubism, the three dimensions of Euclidean geometry had been sufficient for artists. But according to Apollinaire, "geometry is to the plastic arts what grammar is to the art of the writer". Artists, just as scientists, no longer had to limit themselves to three spatial dimensions. They were guided by intuition, to preoccupy themselves with the new possibilities of spatial measurement which included the 'fourth dimension'. This fictitious realm represented the "immensity of space eternalizing itself in all directions at any given moment". This utopian expression stood for the aspiration and premonitions of artists who contemplated Egyptian, African, and oceanic sculptures; who meditated on various scientific works, and who lived "in anticipation of a sublime art".

=== New Painters ===
==== Picasso ====
A man like Picasso studies an object as a surgeon dissects a cadaver. (Un Picasso étudie un objet comme un chirurgien dissèque un cadavre)

Picasso, with his planes to denote volume, "gives an enumeration so complete" that objects are entirely transformed, "thanks to the effort of the spectator, who is forced to see all the elements simultaneously". In questioning whether Picasso's art is profound rather than noble, Apollinaire answers, "It does not dispense with the observation of nature, and acts upon us as intimately as nature itself."

Pablo Picasso, 1909, Brick Factory at Tortosa (L'Usine, Horta de Ebro), oil on canvas, 50.7 x 60.2 cm, Hermitage Museum, Saint Petersburg

Pablo Picasso, 1911–12, L'Homme à la clarinette (Man with a Clarinet), oil on canvas, 106 x 69 cm, Museo Thyssen-Bornemisza, Madrid

Pablo Picasso, 1912, Nature morte Espagnole (Sol y sombra), oil and enamel on canvas, 46 x 63 cm, Lille Métropole Museum of Modern, Contemporary and Outsider Art

Pablo Picasso, 1912, Le violon (Jolie Eva), oil on canvas, 60 x 81 cm, Staatsgalerie Stuttgart

==== Georges Braque ====
It was Braque who, at the Salon des Indépendants of 1908, first exhibited to the public works whose geometric preoccupations began to dominate the composition. Picasso's work, though not exhibited, set the precedent. This transformation, believed Apollinaire, was in perfect harmony with the society in which the painter evolved. Braque's role was "heroic", his art "peaceful and admirable", writes the poet, "He expresses a beauty, a beauty full of tenderness, and the pearl-like quality of his pictures irradiates our understanding. He is an angelic painter."

Georges Braque, 1908, Le Viaduc de L'Estaque (Viaduct at L'Estaque), oil on canvas, 73 x 60 cm, Tel Aviv Museum of Art

Georges Braque, 1910, Violon, verre et couteau (Still Life with Violin, Glass and Knife), oil on canvas, 51 × 67 cm, oval, National Gallery, Prague

Georges Braque, 1911, Nature Morte (The Pedestal Table), oil on canvas, 116.5 x 81.5 cm, Georges Pompidou Center, Paris

Georges Braque, 1911–12, Man with a Guitar (Figure, L'homme à la guitare), oil on canvas, 116.2 x 80.9 cm, Museum of Modern Art

==== Jean Metzinger ====
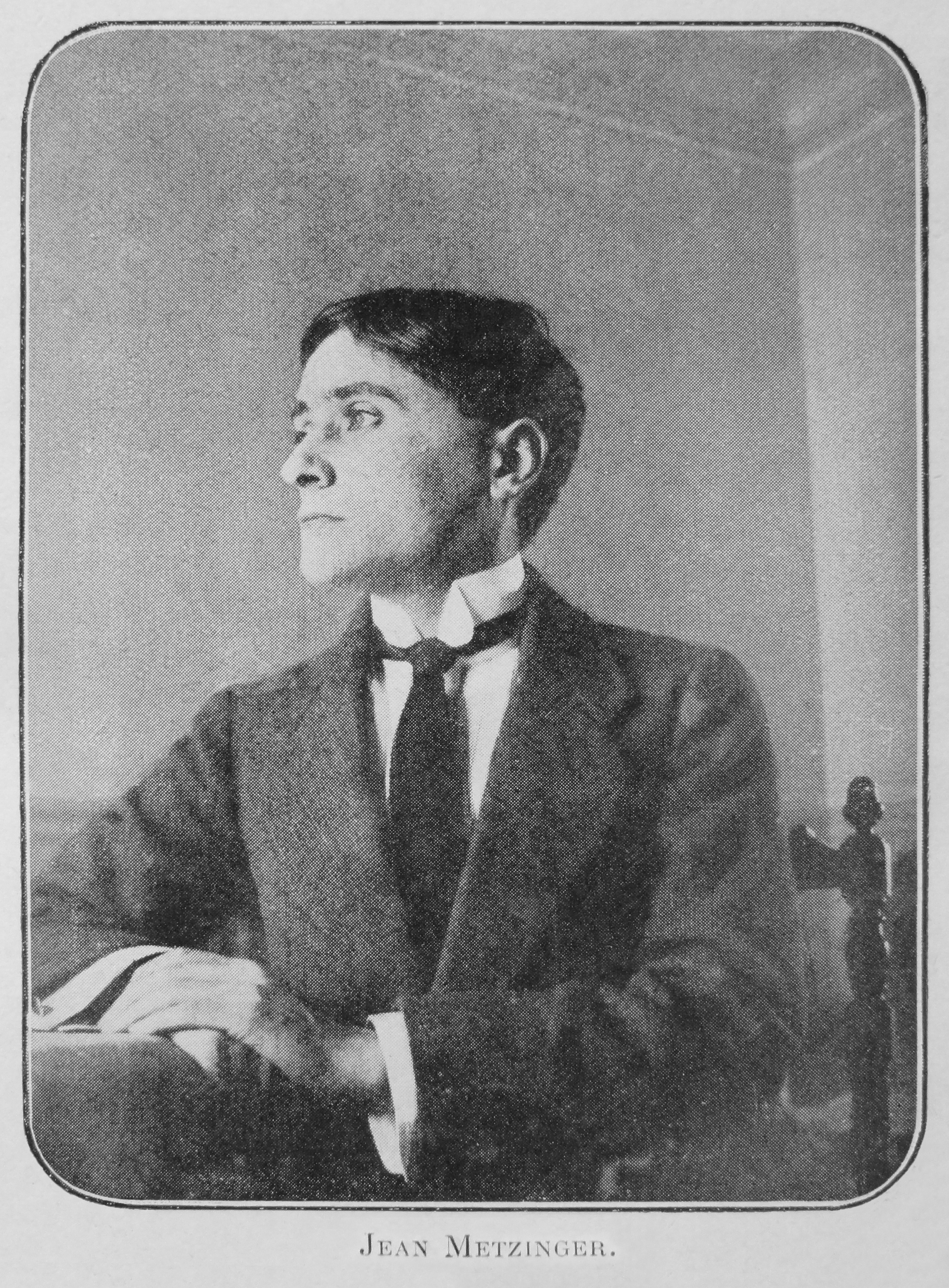
Jean Metzinger

Metzinger, following Picasso and Braque, was chronologically the third Cubist artist, observed Apollinaire. Describing Metzinger, Apollinaire claims this 'great painter's work had not yet been fully appreciated, despite the design, composition, the contrasted lights and an overall style'. His works were "set apart" above and beyond many of the works of his contemporaries. "It was then that Jean Metzinger, joining Picasso and Braque, founded the Cubist City."

There was "nothing incomplete" in the works of Metzinger. His works were the "fruit of a rigorous logic" writes the author. When explaining the art of our epoch, "his work will be one of the surest documents". Metzinger's paintings contained their own 'explanation'. For Apollinaire this was a case "unique in the history of art". For Apollinaire, Metzinger had purity; "his meditations take beautiful forms whose harmony tends to approach the sublime... entirely stripped of all that was known before him. [...] Each one of his pictures contains a judgment of the universe and his entire work resembles a nocturnal firmament when it is clear, free from all clouds and trembling with adorable lights. There is nothing incomplete in his works, poetry ennobles the smallest details."

Jean Metzinger, 1910, Nu à la cheminée (Nude), dimensions and whereabouts unknown

Jean Metzinger, Le goûter (Tea Time), 1911, 75.9 x 70.2 cm, Philadelphia Museum of Art. Also reproduced in Du "Cubisme" (1912)

Jean Metzinger, 1911–12, La Femme au Cheval (Woman with a horse), oil on canvas, 162 x 130 cm, Statens Museum for Kunst, Denmark

Jean Metzinger, 1911–12, Le Port (The Harbor). Exhibited at the 1912 Salon des Indépendants, Paris. Also reproduced in Du "Cubisme"

==== Albert Gleizes ====
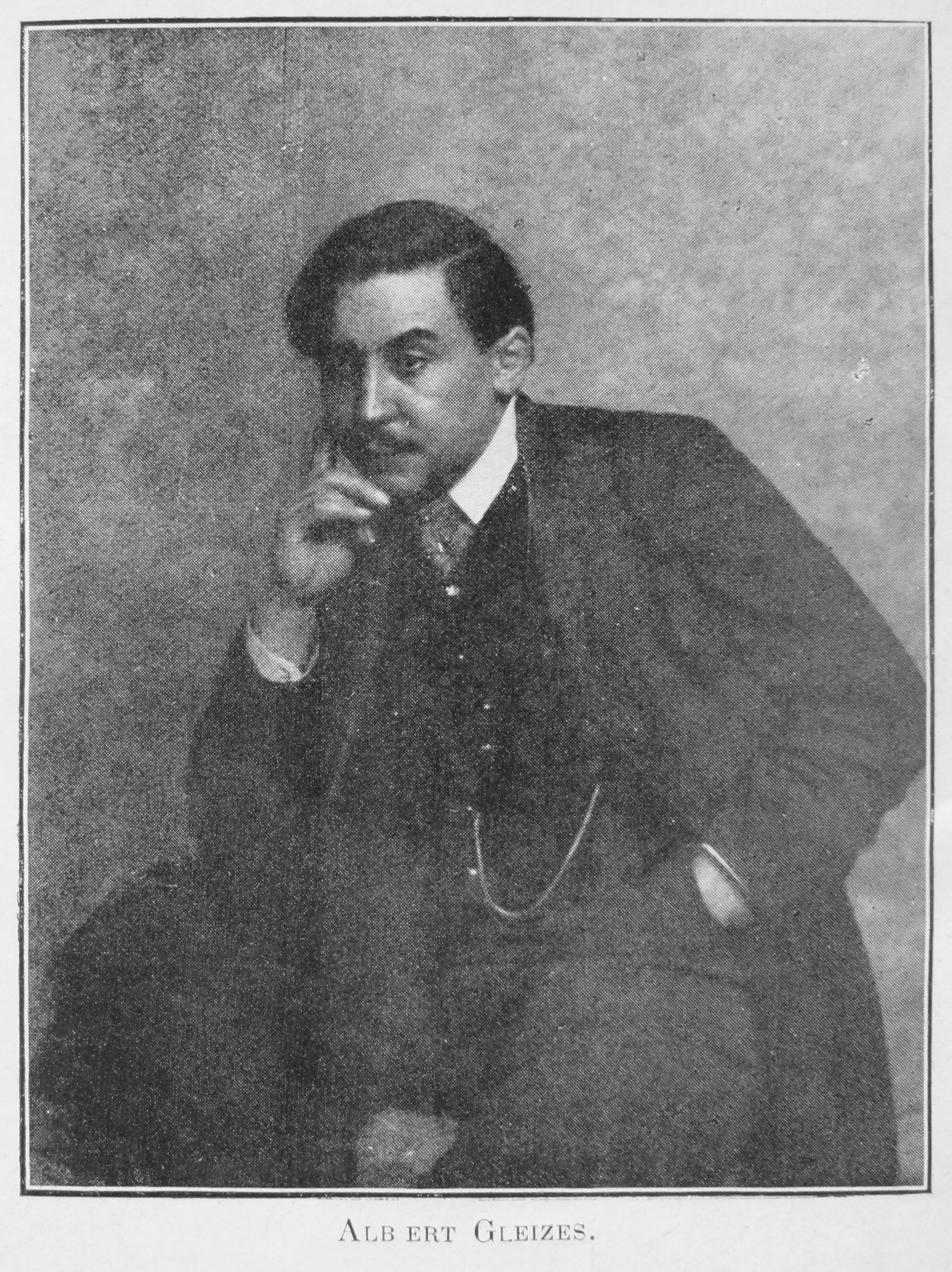
Albert Gleizes

The works of Gleizes show "powerful harmonies", but Apollinaire warns of confounding his paintings with the "theoretical cubism" of the "scientific painters". Referring to the writings of Gleizes, Apollinaire cites the will of the artist to "bring back his art to his simplest elements".

Gleizes had understood the influence of Cézanne on the Cubists, writes Apollinaire. The work of Gleizes, he continues, has "a degree of plasticity such that all the elements which constitute the individual characters are represented with the same dramatic majesty".

Majesty above all characterized the art of Gleizes, bringing a startling innovation to contemporary art, as few of the modern painters had done before. "This majesty arouses and provokes the imagination... the immensity of things. This art is vigorous... realized by a force of the same sort as that which realized the Pyramids and the Cathedrals, the constructions in metal, the bridges and the tunnels."

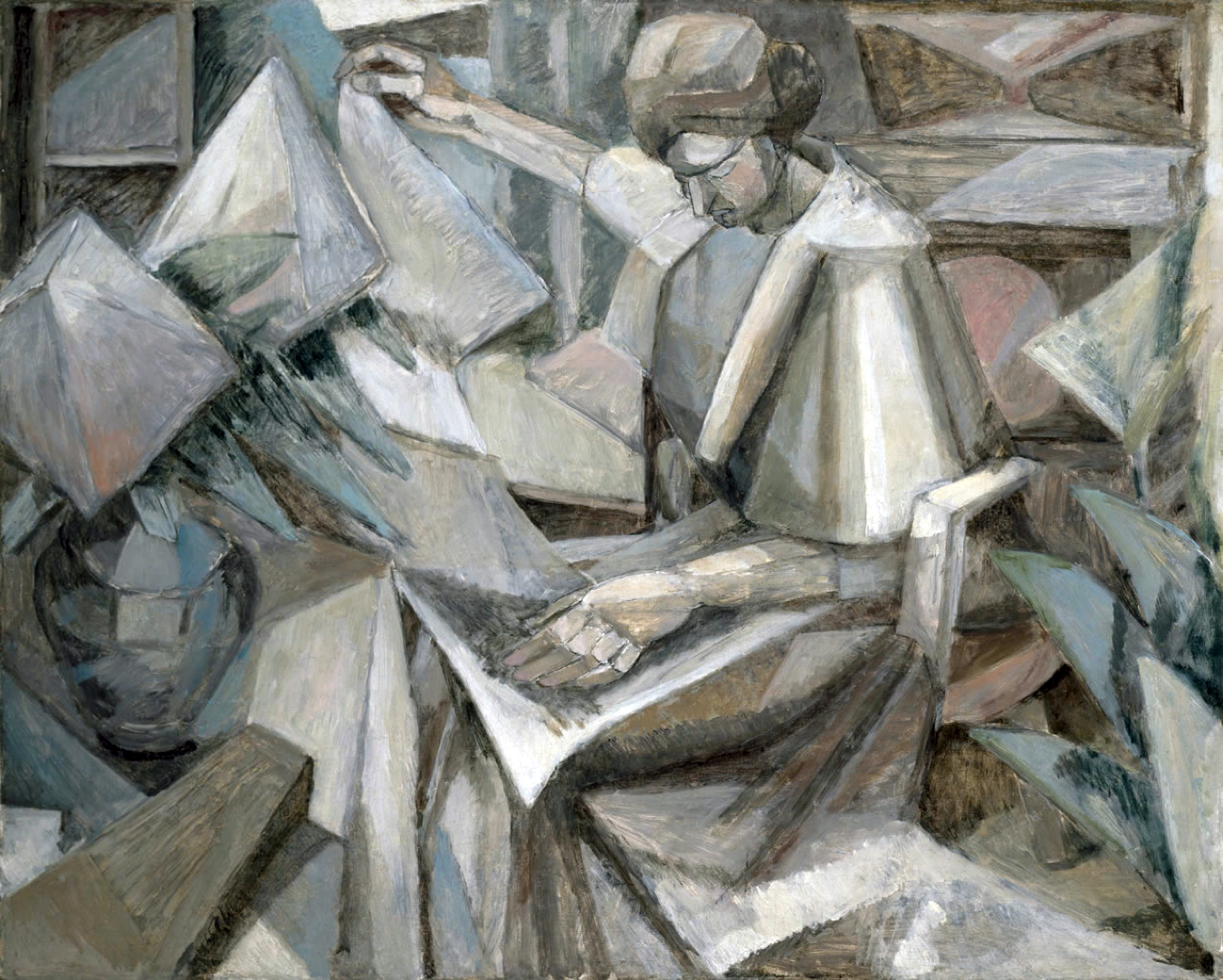
Albert Gleizes, 1910, La Femme aux Phlox (Woman with Phlox), oil on canvas, 81 x 100 cm, exhibited Armory Show, New York, 1913, Museum of Fine Arts, Houston

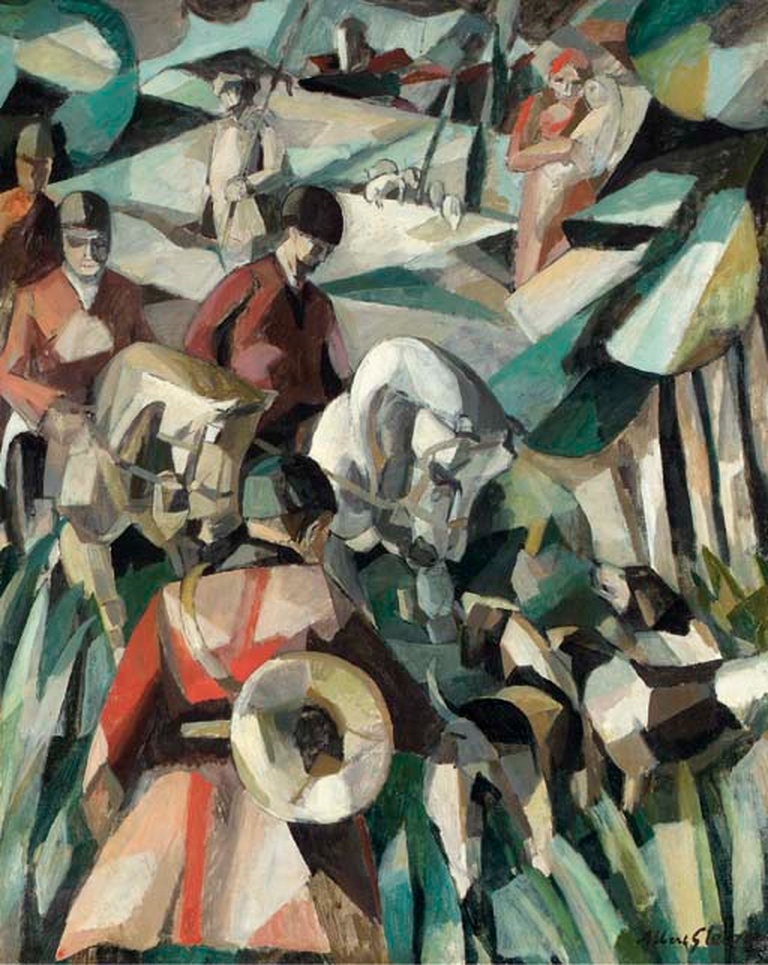
Albert Gleizes, 1911, La Chasse (The Hunt), oil on canvas, 123.2 x 99 cm

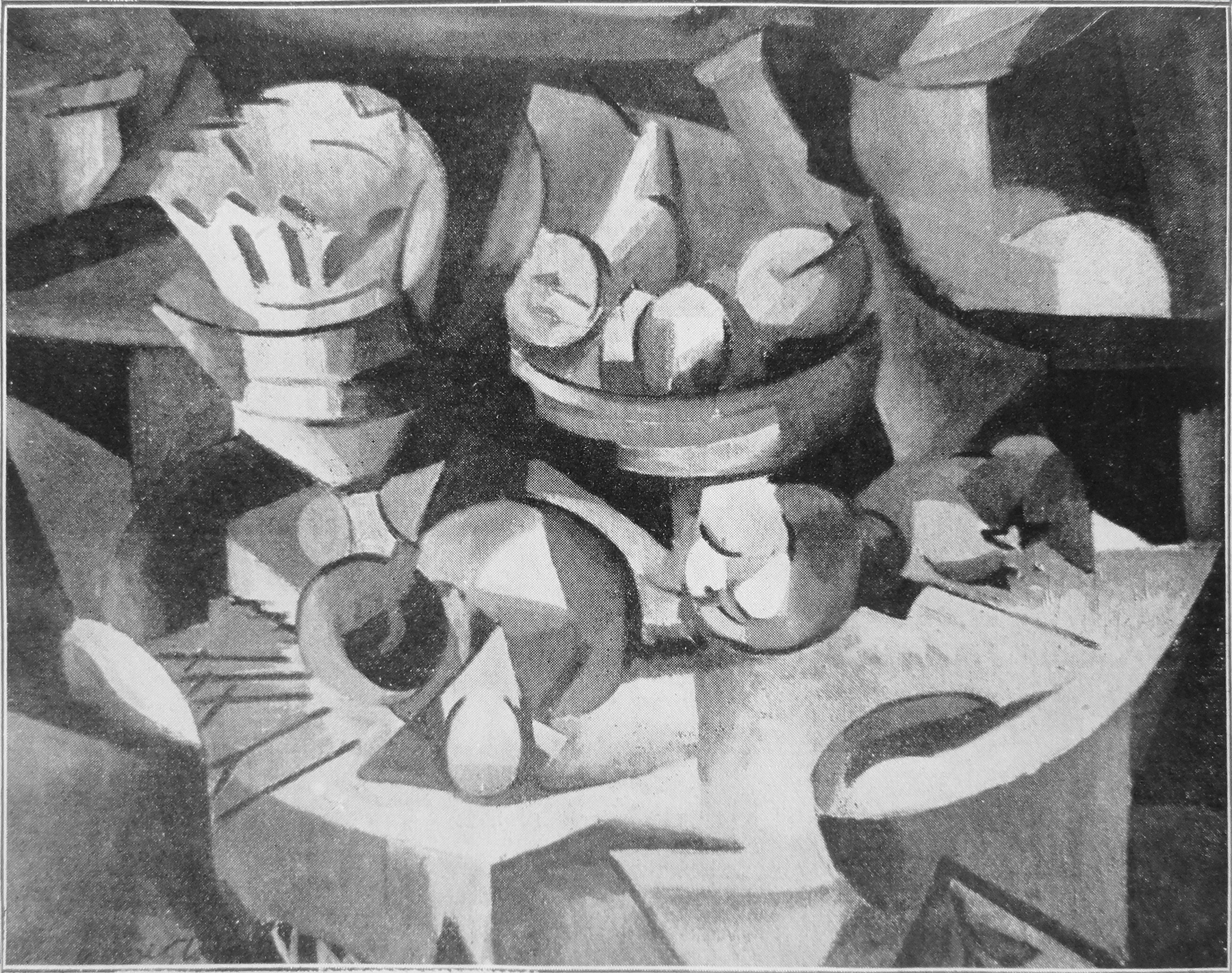
Albert Gleizes, 1911, Nature morte (Still Life), requisition by the Nazis in 1937, and missing since

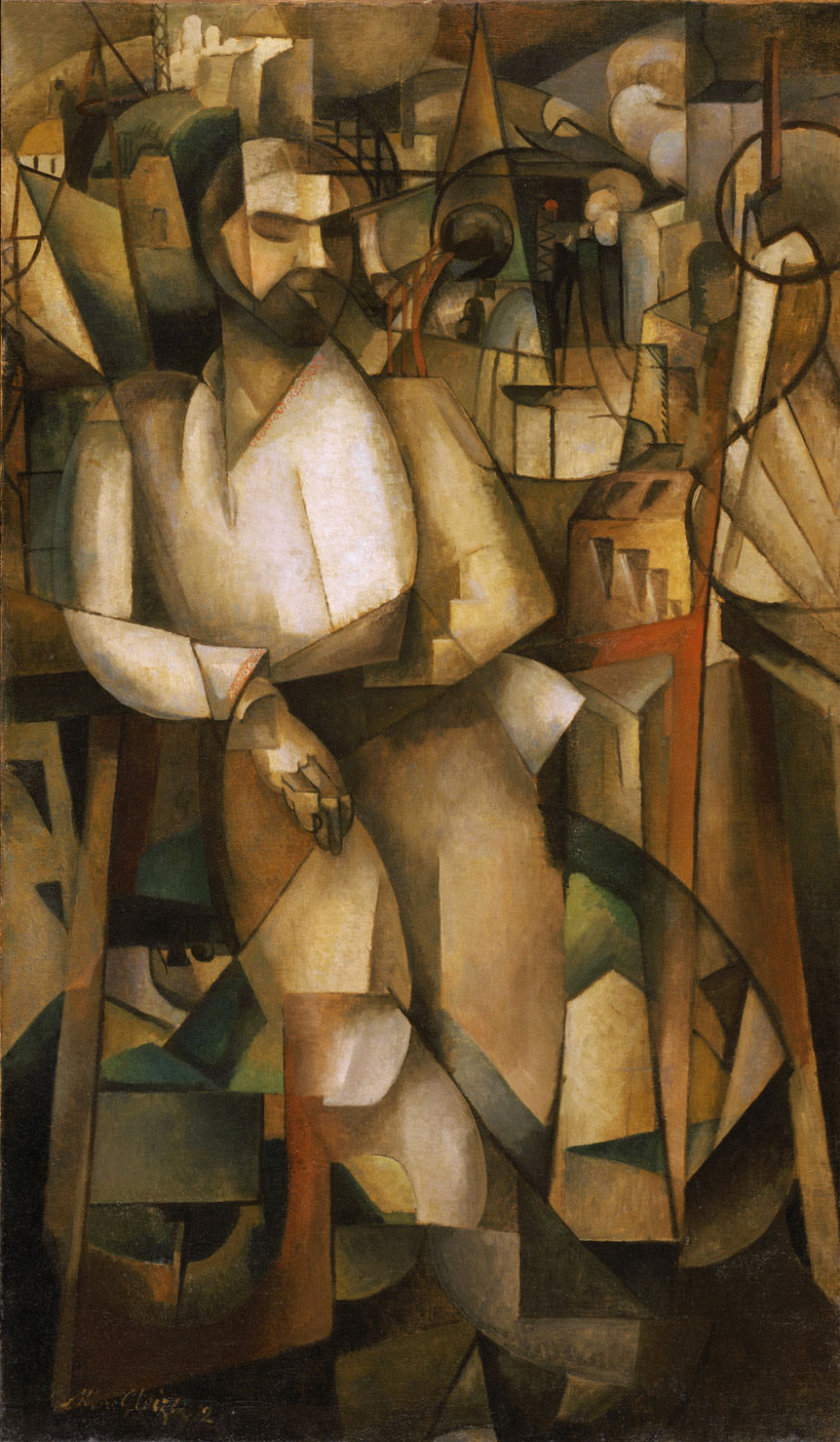
Albert Gleizes, 1912, l'Homme au Balcon, Man on a Balcony (Portrait of Dr. Théo Morinaud), oil on canvas, 195.6 x 114.9 cm, Philadelphia Museum of Art

==== Marie Laurencin ====
The art of Laurencin (and women more generally) brought a "new vision full of the joy of the universe", an "entirely feminine aesthetic" writes Apollinaire. As an artist, he placed Laurencin between Picasso and Le Douanier Rousseau, not as a hierarchical indication, but as a statement of relationship. "Her art dances, like Salome, between that of Picasso, who like a new John the Baptist bathes all the arts in a baptism of light, and that of Rousseau, a sentimental Herod." The author states the similarities to dance and "rhythmic enumeration, infinitely gracious in painting".

"Feminine Art, the art of Laurencin, tends to become a pure arabesque humanized by an attentive observation of nature, which, being expressive, forsakes simple decoration while remaining just as agreeable."

Marie Laurencin, 1909, Réunion à la campagne (Apollinaire et ses amis), oil on canvas, 130 x 194 cm, Musée Picasso, Paris

Marie Laurencin, 1910–11, Les jeunes filles (Jeune Femmes, Young Girls), oil on canvas, 115 x 146 cm. Exhibited Salon des Indépendants, 1911, Moderna Museet, Stockholm

Marie Laurencin, 1911, Les jeunes femmes (Die Jungen Damen, The young women)

Marie Laurencin, Femme à l'éventail (Woman with a fan). Also reproduced in Du "Cubisme"

===== Henri Rousseau =====
Rousseau died in September 1910. Apollinaire made clear the great esteem held by the Cubist painters for his works, calling Rousseau the "Inhabitant of Delight". It was for Apollinaire the qualities of his work that made his painting "so charming to look at". Few artists had been mocked during their lifetime as Rousseau, and even fewer had faced with equal calm the hail of insults. And happily, writes Apollinaire, he "was able to find, in insults and mockeries, evidence that even the ill-intentioned could not disregard his work".

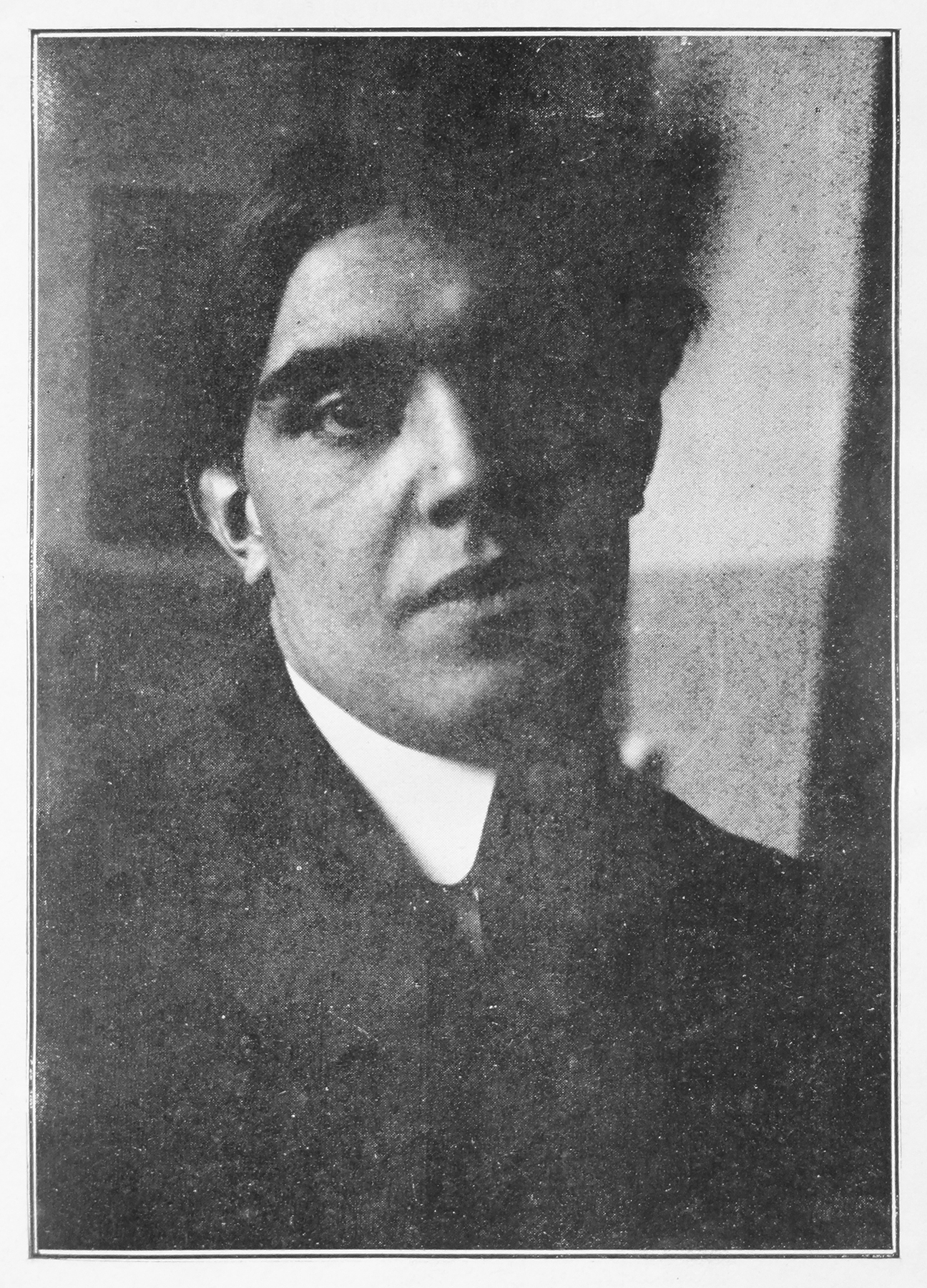
Juan Gris

Rousseau had painted two portraits of Apollinaire: "I often watched him at work, and I know the care he gave to the tiniest details; he had the capacity to keep the original and definitive conception of his picture always before him until he had realized it; and he left nothing, above all, nothing essential, to chance. Its nervous draftsmanship, variety, charm, and delicacy of tones make this work's excellence. His pictures of flowers show the resources of charm and emphasis in the soul and hand of the Douanier."

==== Juan Gris ====
Gris had "meditated on everything modern", painting "to conceive only new structures" and "materially pure forms". Apollinaire compares the work of Gris with the "scientific cubism" of Picasso, "his only master", a type of drawing that was geometrical individualized, "a profoundly intellectual art, according to color a merely symbolic significance". His works had "purity, scientifically conceived", and "from this purity parallels are sure to spring".

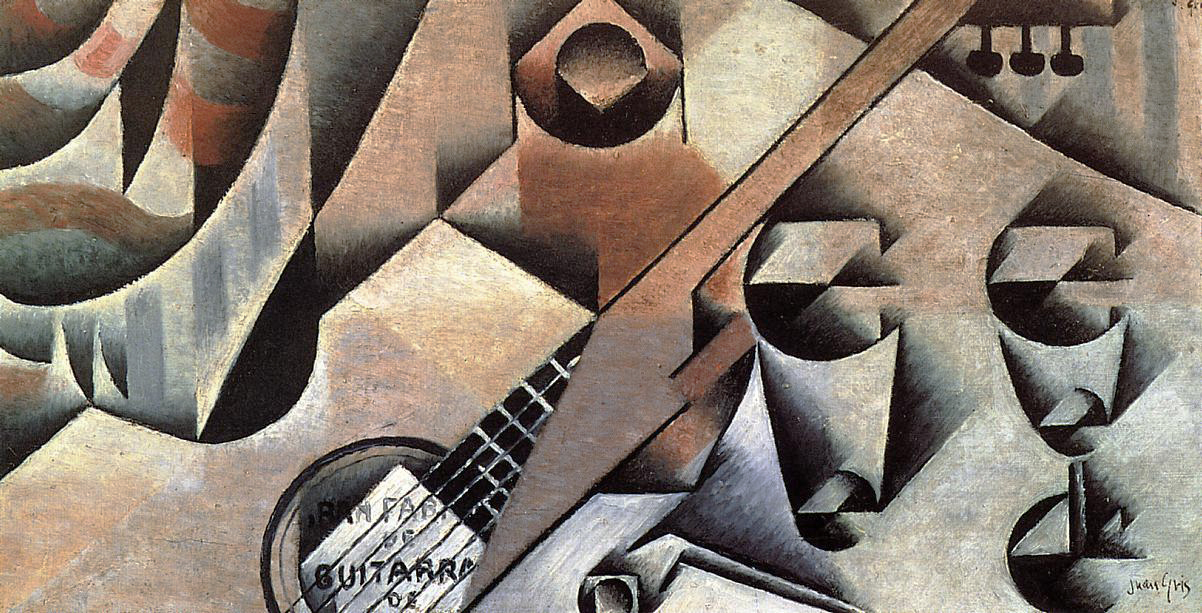
Juan Gris, 1912, La Guitare (Guitar and Glasses), oil on canvas, 30 x 58 cm, private collection

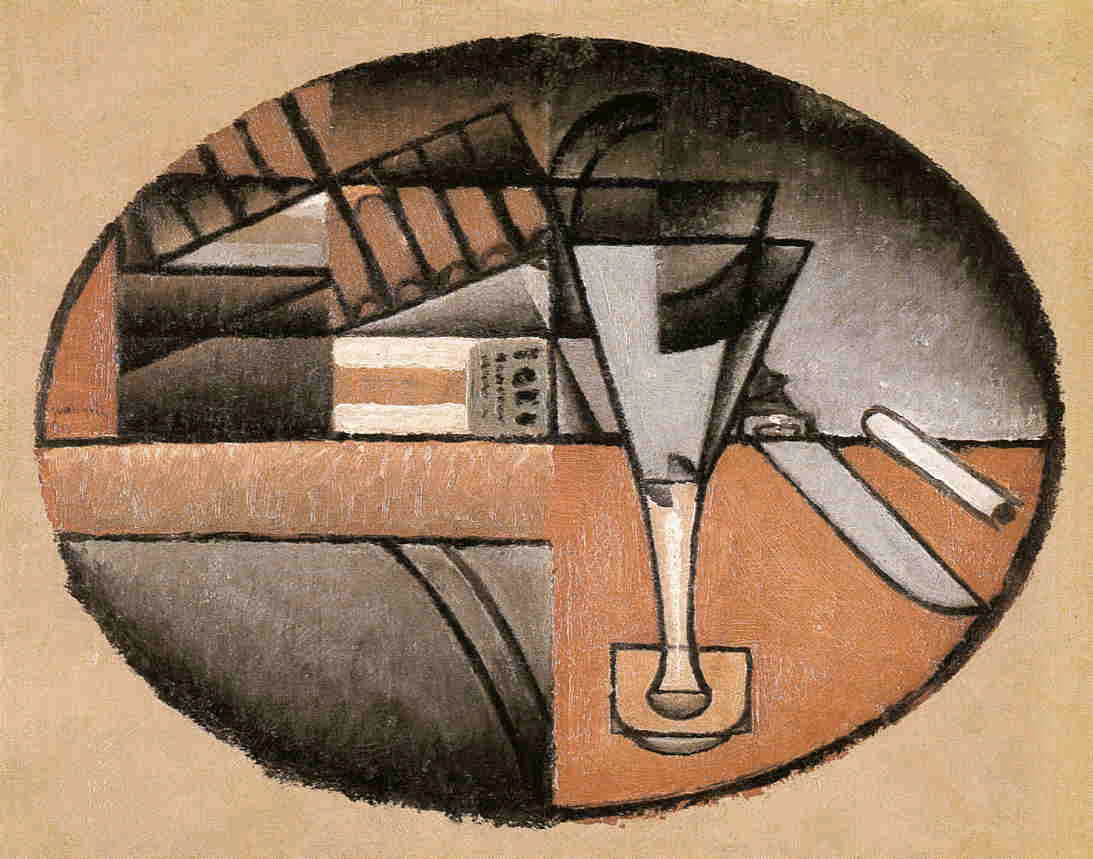
Juan Gris, 1912, Les Cigares (The Packet of Cigars), oil on canvas, 22 x 28 cm, private collection

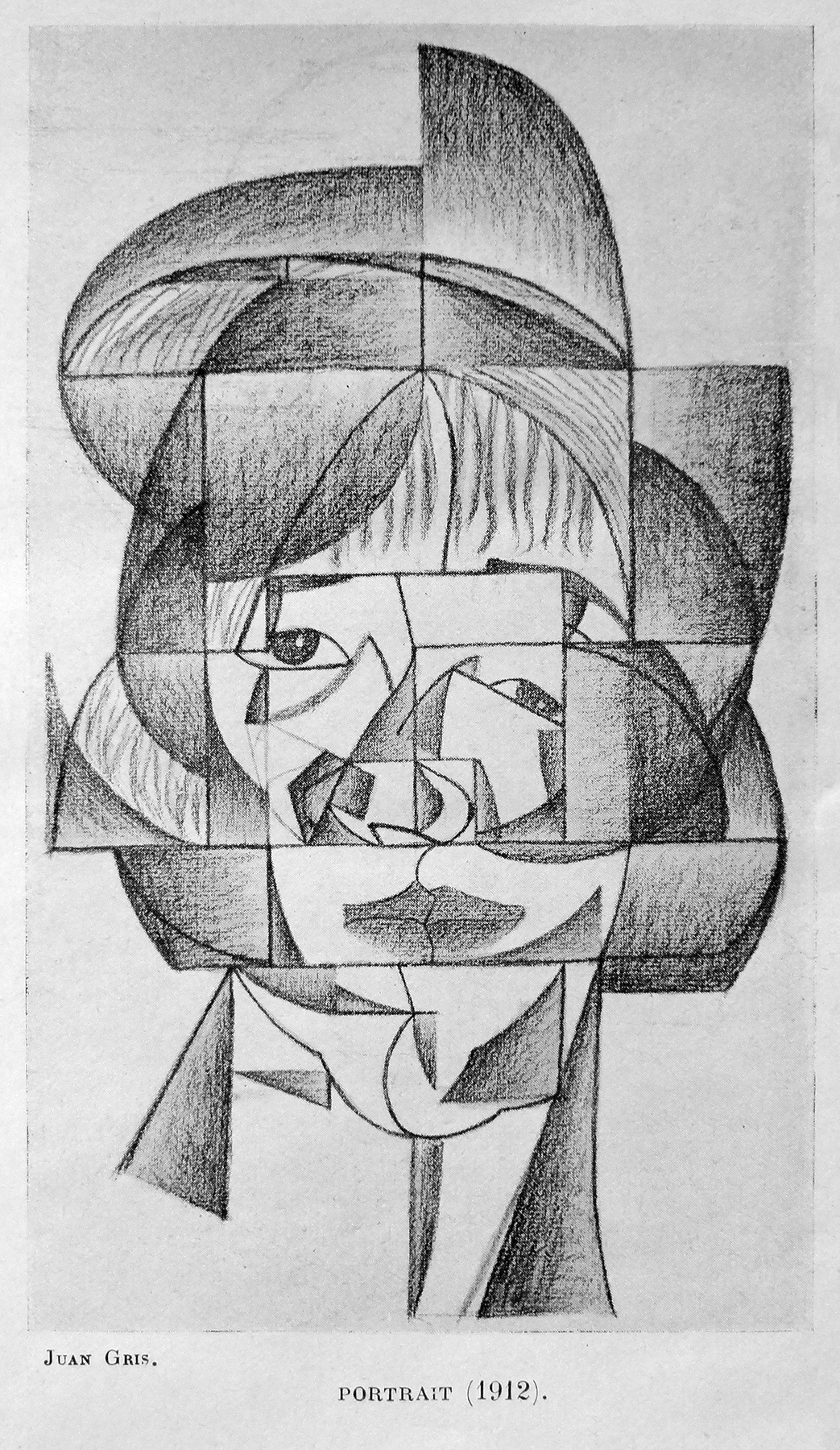
Juan Gris, 1912, Portrait (Etude pour le Portrait de Germaine Raynal), pencil and charcoal on paper, 36 x 26.5 cm, private collection

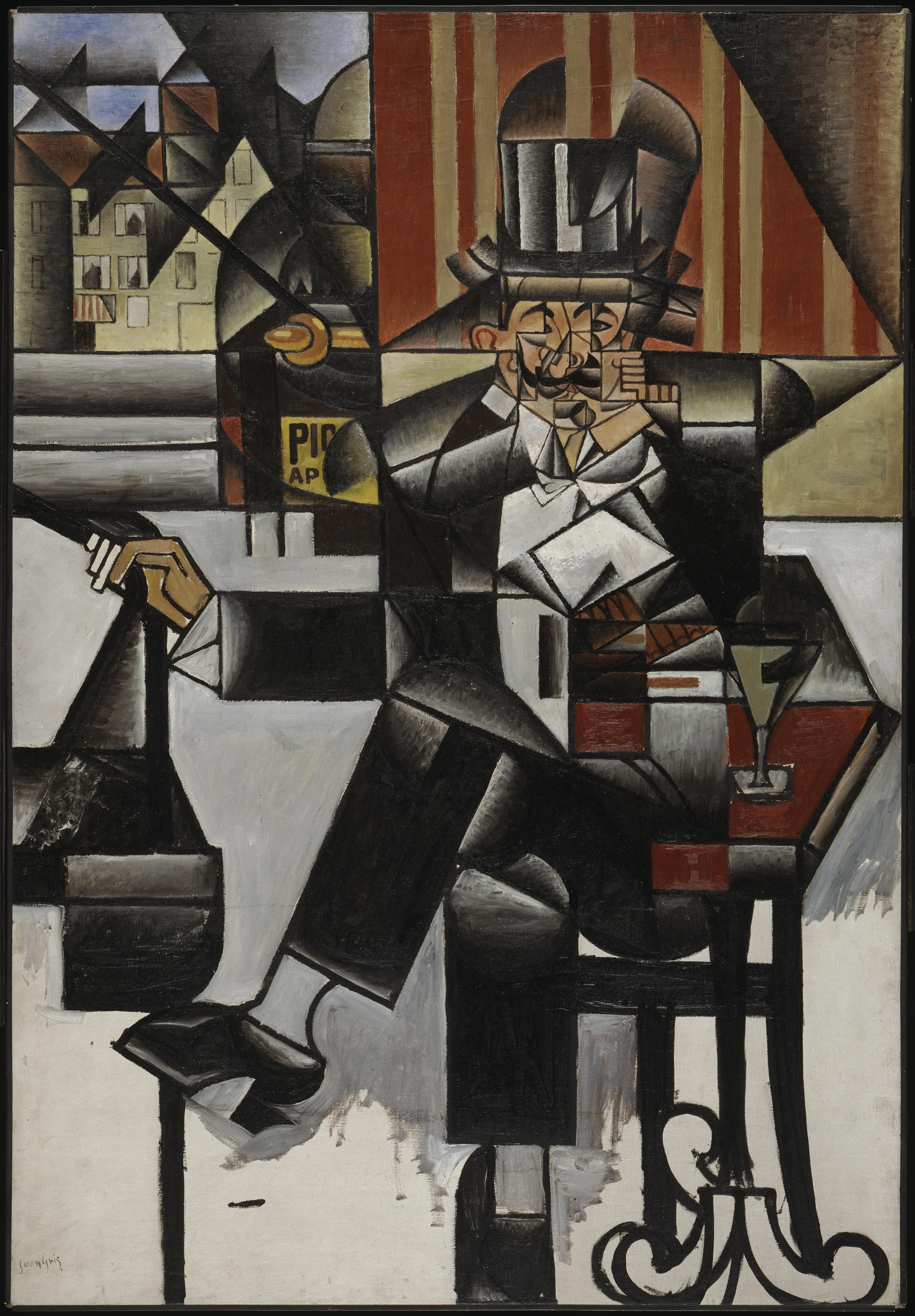
Juan Gris, 1912, Man in a Café, oil on canvas, 127.6 x 88.3 cm, Philadelphia Museum of Art. Only the upper half of this painting was reproduced in Les Peintres Cubistes

==== Fernand Léger ====
Léger is described as a talented artist. "I love his art because it is not scornful, because it knows no servility, and because it does not reason. I love your light colors [couleurs légers], O Fernand Léger! Fantasy does not lift you to fairylands, but it grants you all your joys."

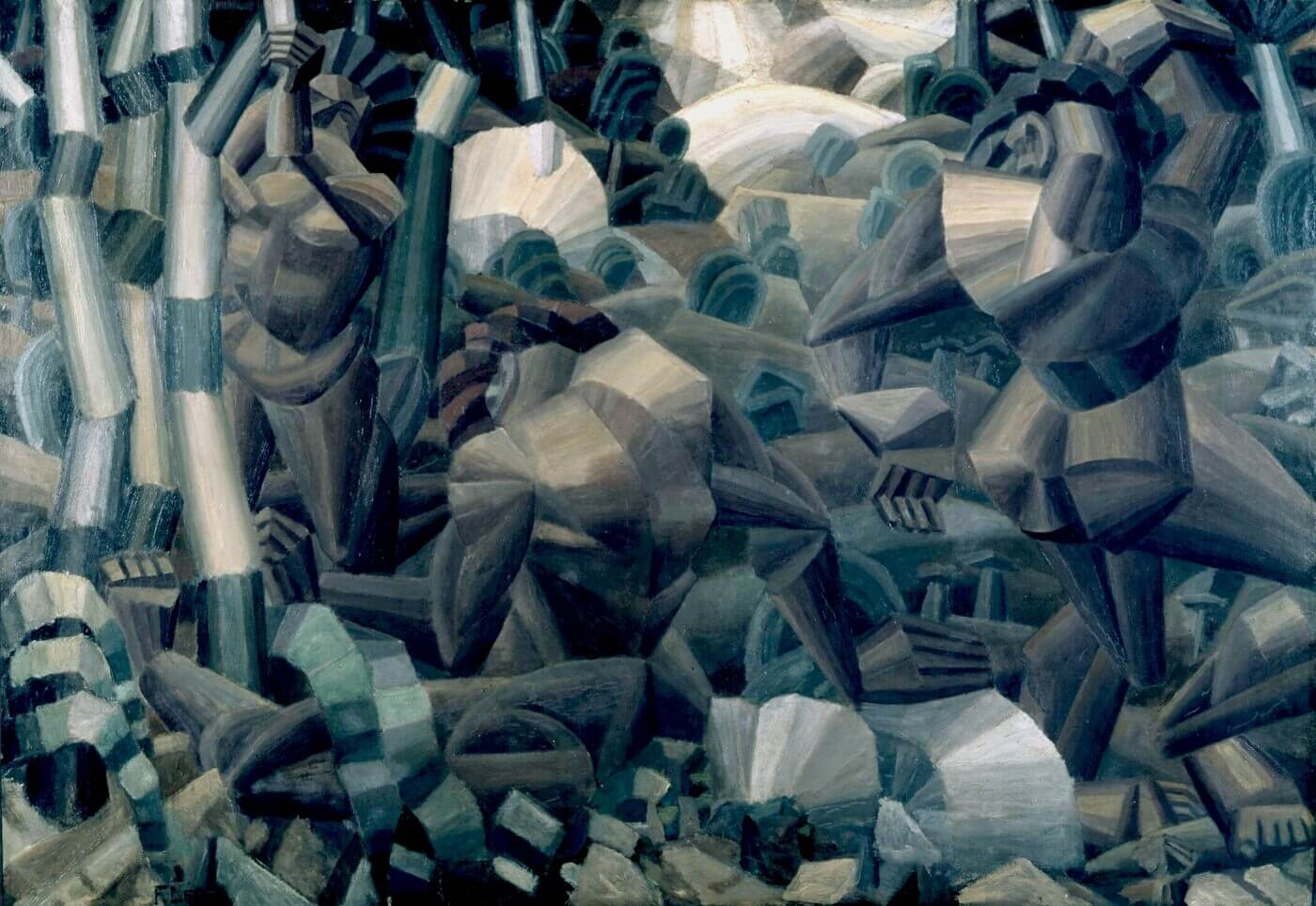
Fernand Léger, 1910, Nudes in the forest (Nus dans la forêt), oil on canvas, 120 x 170 cm, Kröller-Müller Museum

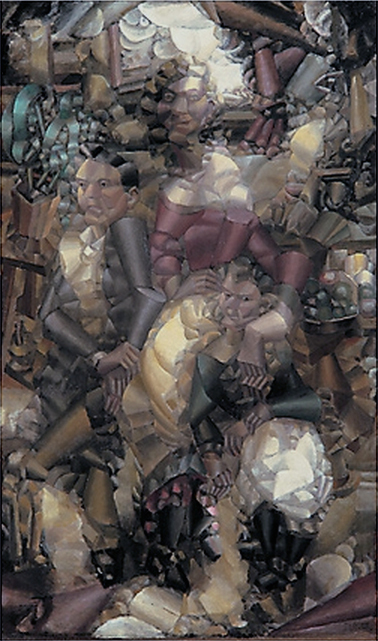
Fernand Léger, 1911, Étude pour trois portraits (Study for Three Portraits), oil on canvas, 194.9 × 116.5 cm, Milwaukee Art Museum

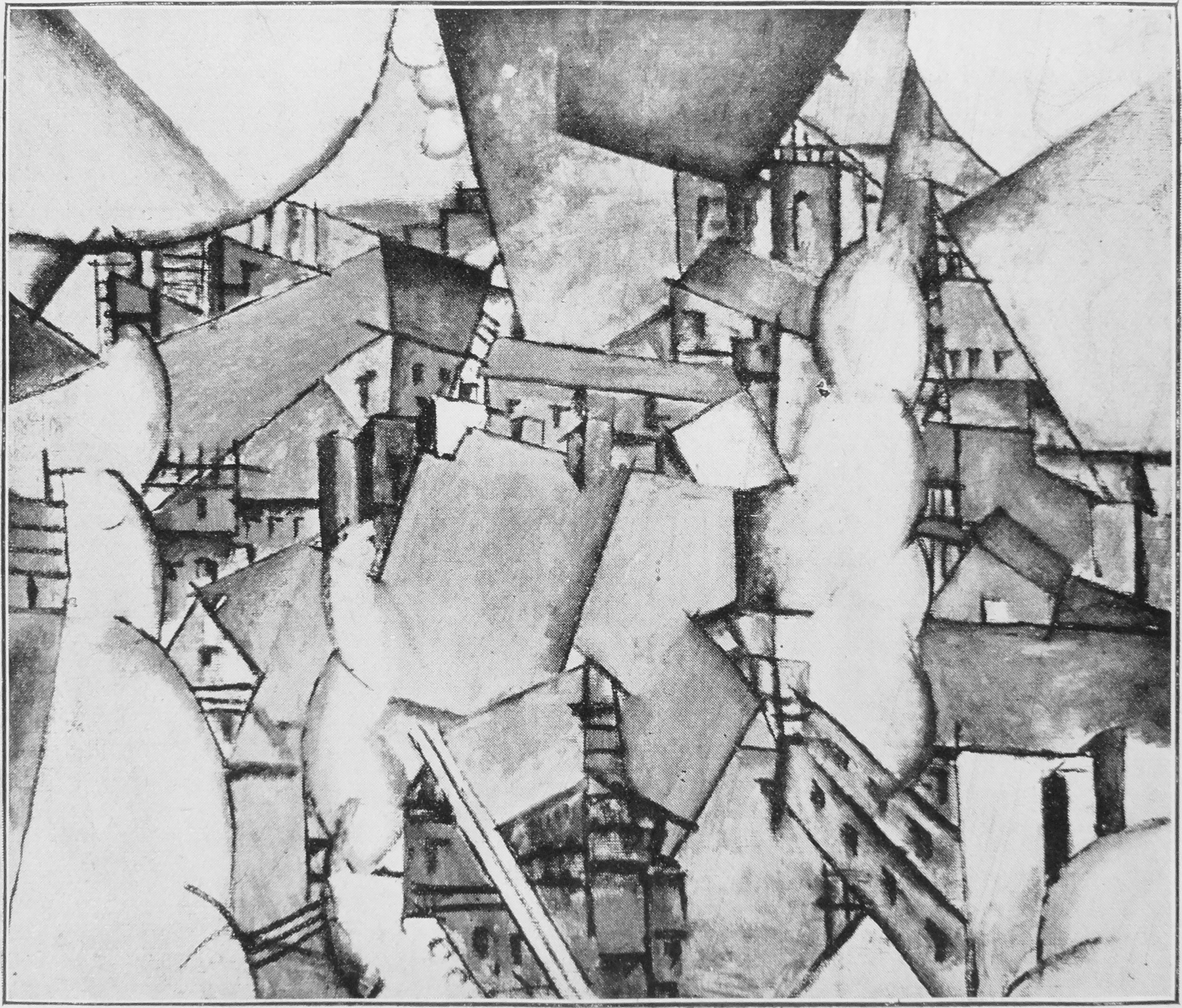
Fernand Léger, 1912, Les Fumées

Fernand Léger, La Femme en Bleu (Woman in Blue), 1912, oil on canvas, 193 x 129.9 cm, Kunstmuseum Basel

==== Francis Picabia ====
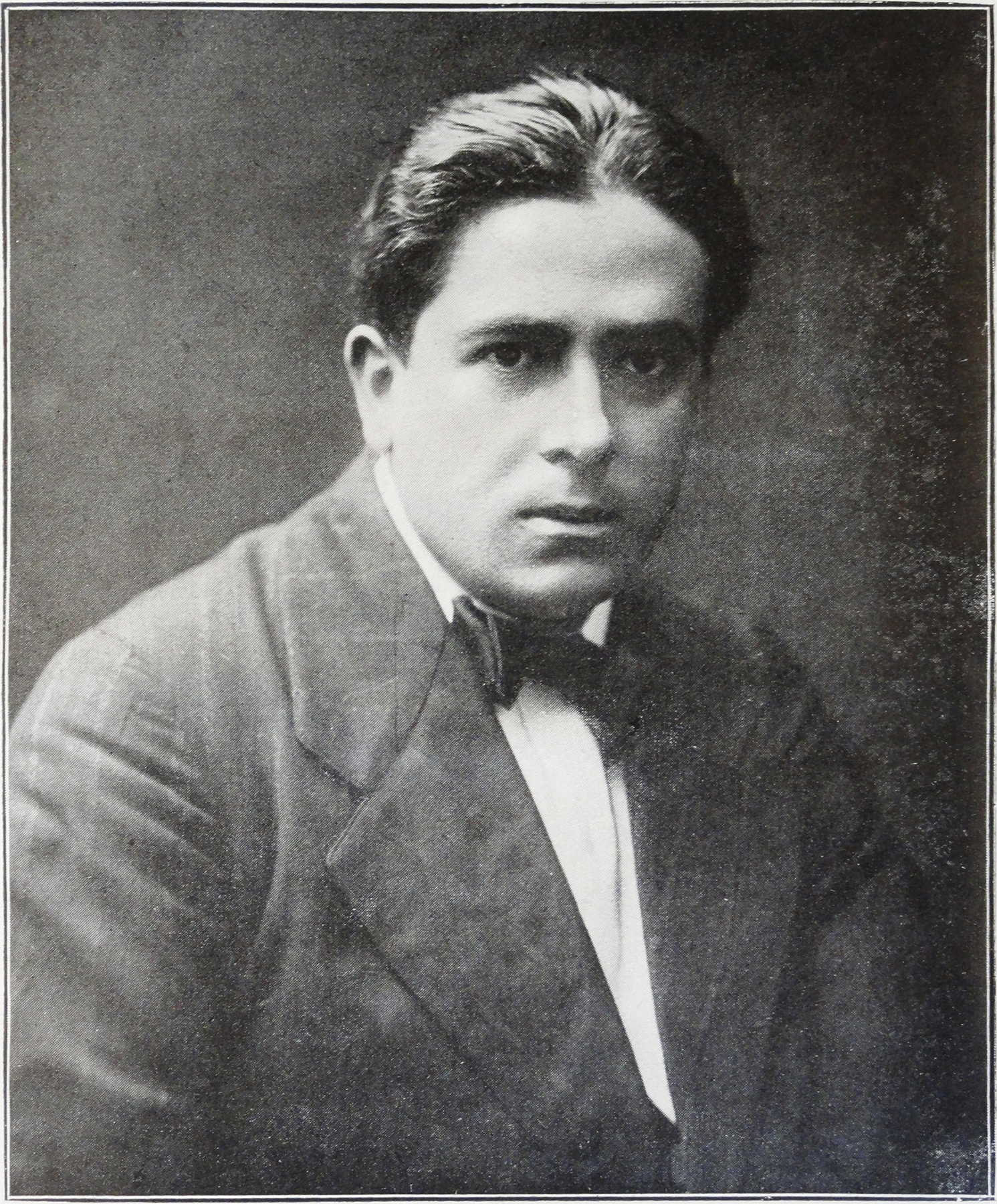
Francis Picabia

Just as the Impressionists and the Fauves, Picabia "translated light into color", arriving at "an entirely new art". His color was not just a "luminous transposition" without "symbolic significance". It was a "form and light of whatever is represented".

As in the works of Robert Delaunay, color was for Picabia "the ideal dimension", one that incorporated all other dimensions. Form was symbolic, while the color remained formal. It was "a perfectly legitimate art, and surely a very subtle one". Color was saturated with energy and prolonged in space.

The title for Picabia was intellectually inseparable from the work to which it referred, playing a role as actual objects. Analogous to Picabia's titles, real objects, "are the pictorial arabesques in the backgrounds of Laurencin's pictures. With Albert Gleizes this function is taken by the right angles which retain light, with Fernand Léger by bubbles, with Metzinger by vertical lines, parallel to the sides of the frame cut by infrequent echelons." Apollinaire found equivalence in the works of all the great painters. "It gives pictorial intensity to a painting, and this is enough to justify its legitimacy."

It was not a question of abstraction, but of "direct pleasure". Surprise played an important role. "Can the taste of a peach be called abstract?" mused the author. Each picture of Picabia "has a definite existence, the limits of which are set by the title". Picabia's paintings were so far from a priori abstractions that "the painter can tell you the history of each one of them. Dance at the Spring is simply the expression of a plastic emotion experienced spontaneously near Naples".

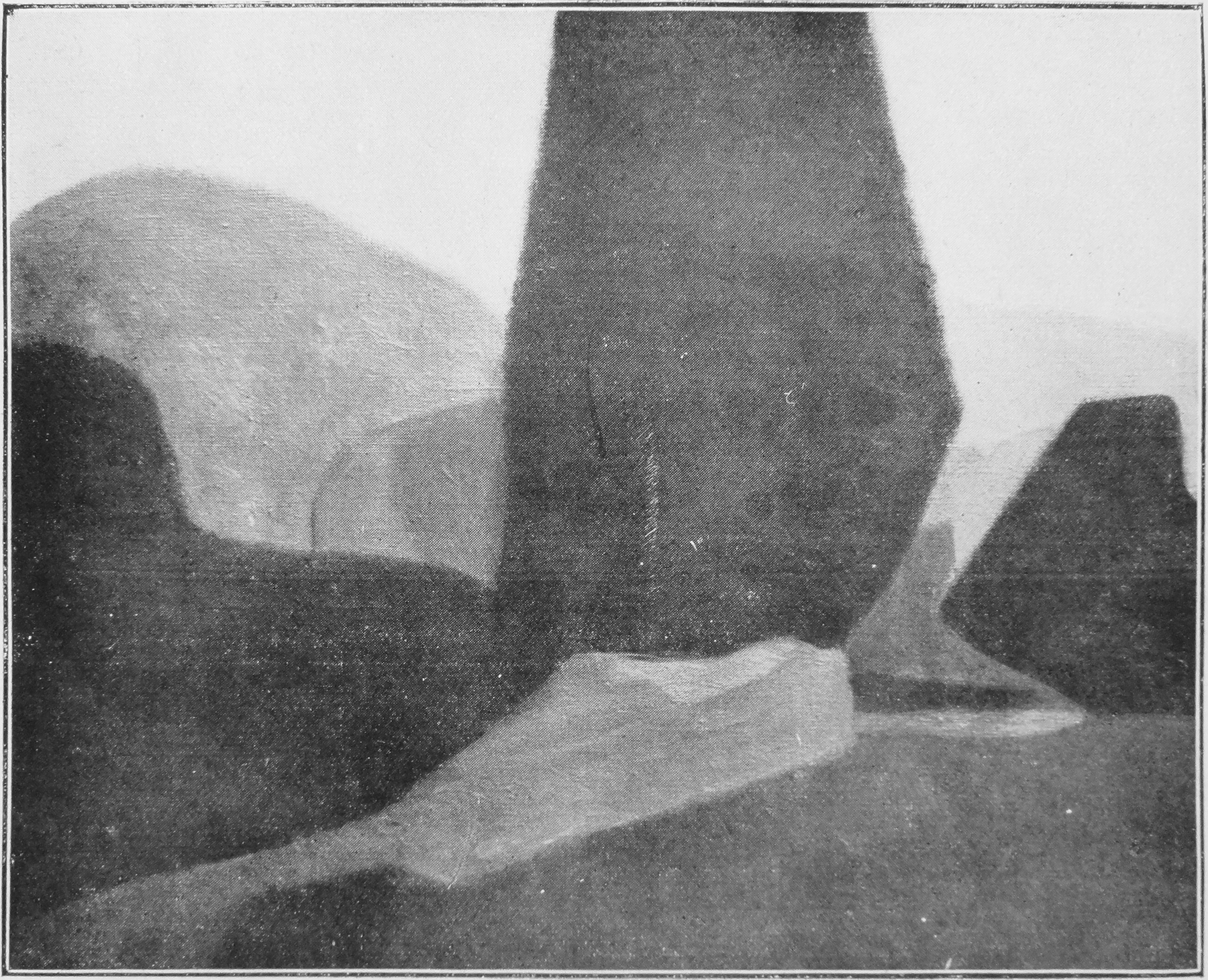
Francis Picabia, Paysage (Landscape)

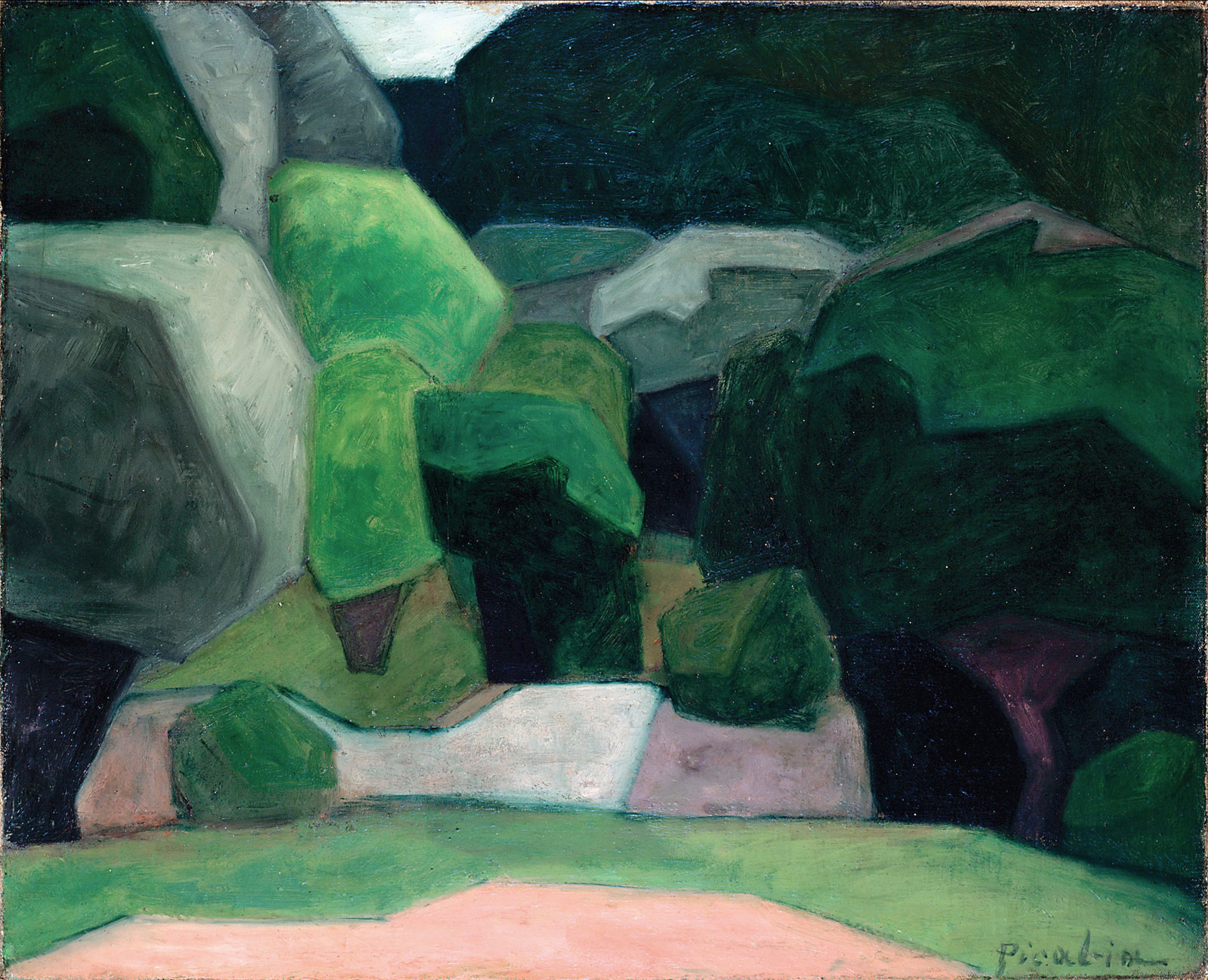
Francis Picabia, 1911–12, Paysage à Cassis (Landscape at Cassis), oil on canvas, 50.3 × 61.5 cm, private collection

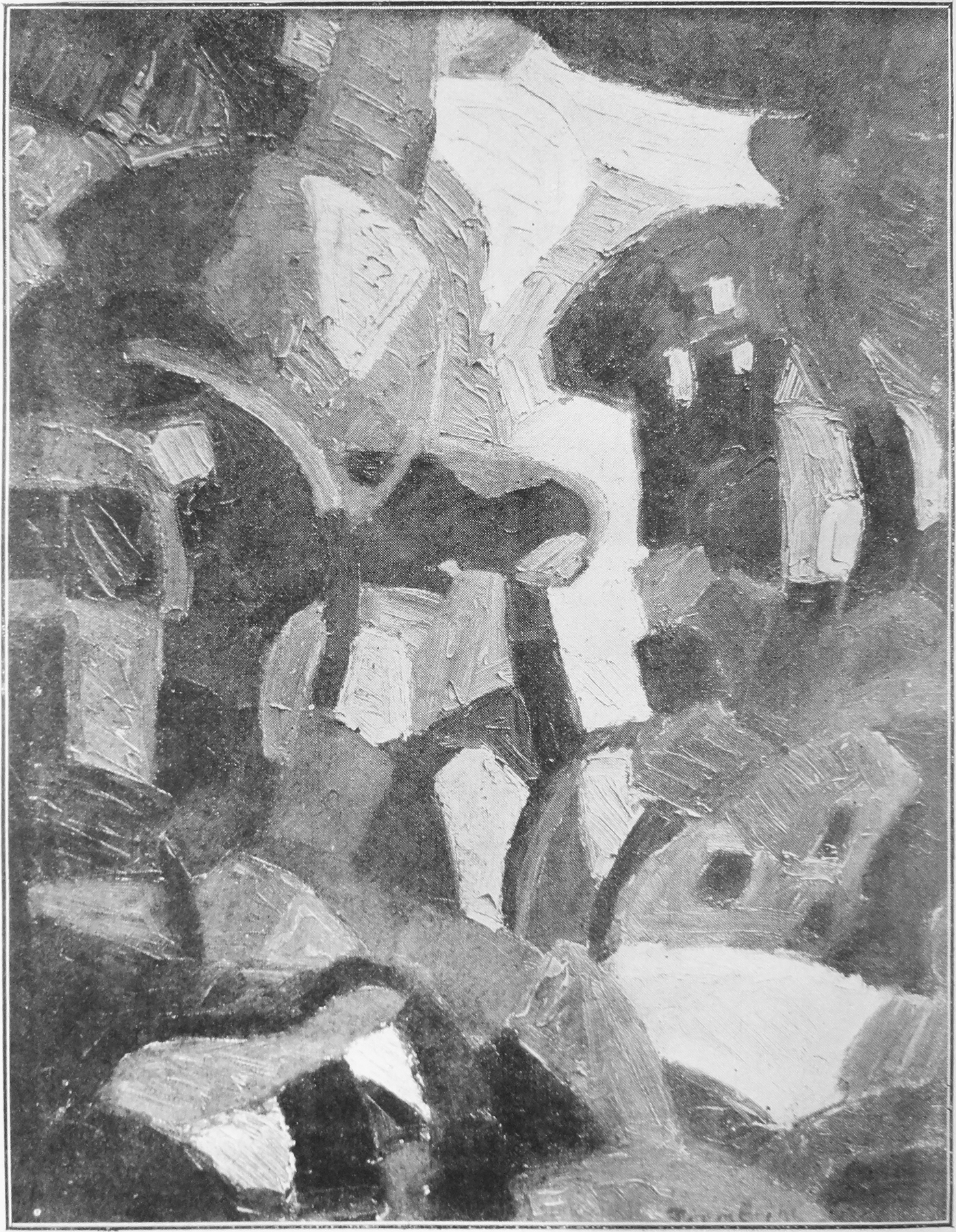
Francis Picabia, c.1912, L'Arbre rouge (Paysage)

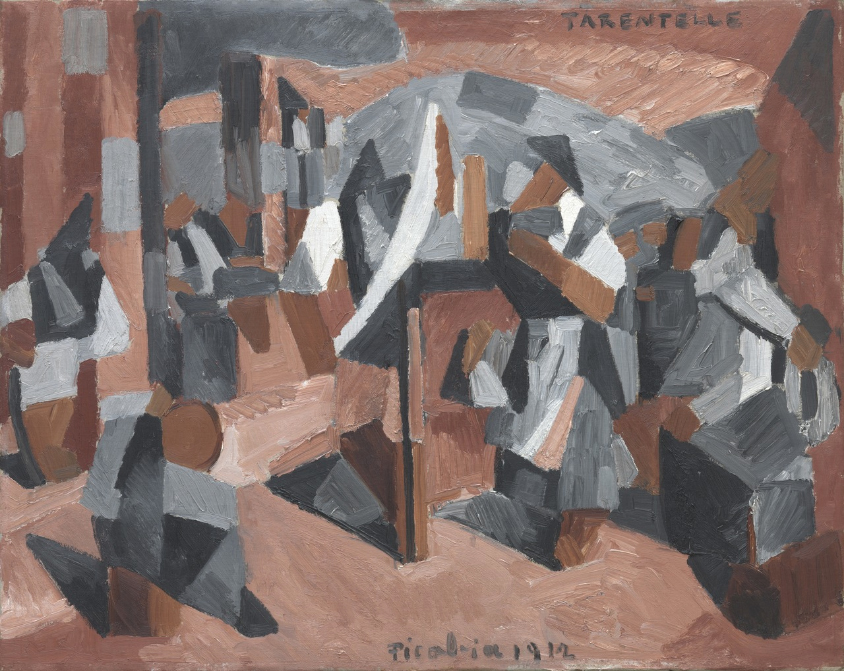
Francis Picabia, 1912, Tarentelle, oil on canvas, 73.6 x 92.1 cm, Museum of Modern Art, New York

Marcel Duchamp

==== Marcel Duchamp ====
To date, Duchamp's production had been too spars and differed considerably from one painting to the next. Apollinaire hesitated to make any broad generalizations, noting rather Duchamp's apparent talent and his abandoning of "the cult of appearances". To free his art from all perceptions, Duchamp wrote the titles on the paintings themselves. "This literature, which so few painters have been able to avoid, disappears from his art, but not poetry. He uses forms and colors, not to render appearances, but to penetrate the essential nature of forms and formal colors... Perhaps it will be the task of an artist as detached from aesthetic preoccupations, and as intent on the energetic as Marcel Duchamp, to reconcile art and the people."

Marcel Duchamp, 1910, Joueur d'échecs (The Chess Game), oil on canvas, 114 x 146.5 cm, Philadelphia Museum of Art

Marcel Duchamp, 1911–12, Nude (Study), Sad Young Man on a Train (Nu, esquisse, jeune homme triste dans un train), oil on cardboard mounted on Masonite, 100 x 73 cm, Peggy Guggenheim Collection, Venice

Marcel Duchamp, 1912, Le Roi et la Reine entourés de Nus vites (The King and Queen Surrounded by Swift Nudes), oil on canvas, 114.6 x 128.9 cm, Philadelphia Museum of Art

Marcel Duchamp, 1912, Nude Descending a Staircase, No. 2, oil on canvas, 147 cm × 89.2 cm, Philadelphia Museum of Art

=== Appendix ===
==== Duchamp-Villon ====
The departure of sculpture from nature tends toward architecture, writes Apollinaire: "The utilitarian end aimed at by most contemporary architects is responsible for the great backwardness of architecture as compared with the other arts. The architect, the engineer should have sublime aims: to build the highest tower, to prepare for time and ivy the most beautiful of ruins, to throw across a harbor or a river an arch more audacious than the rainbow, and finally to compose to a lasting harmony, the most powerful ever imagined by man. Duchamp-Villon had this titanic conception of architecture. A sculptor and an architect, light is the only thing that count for him; but in all the arts, also, it is only light, the incorruptible light, that counts."

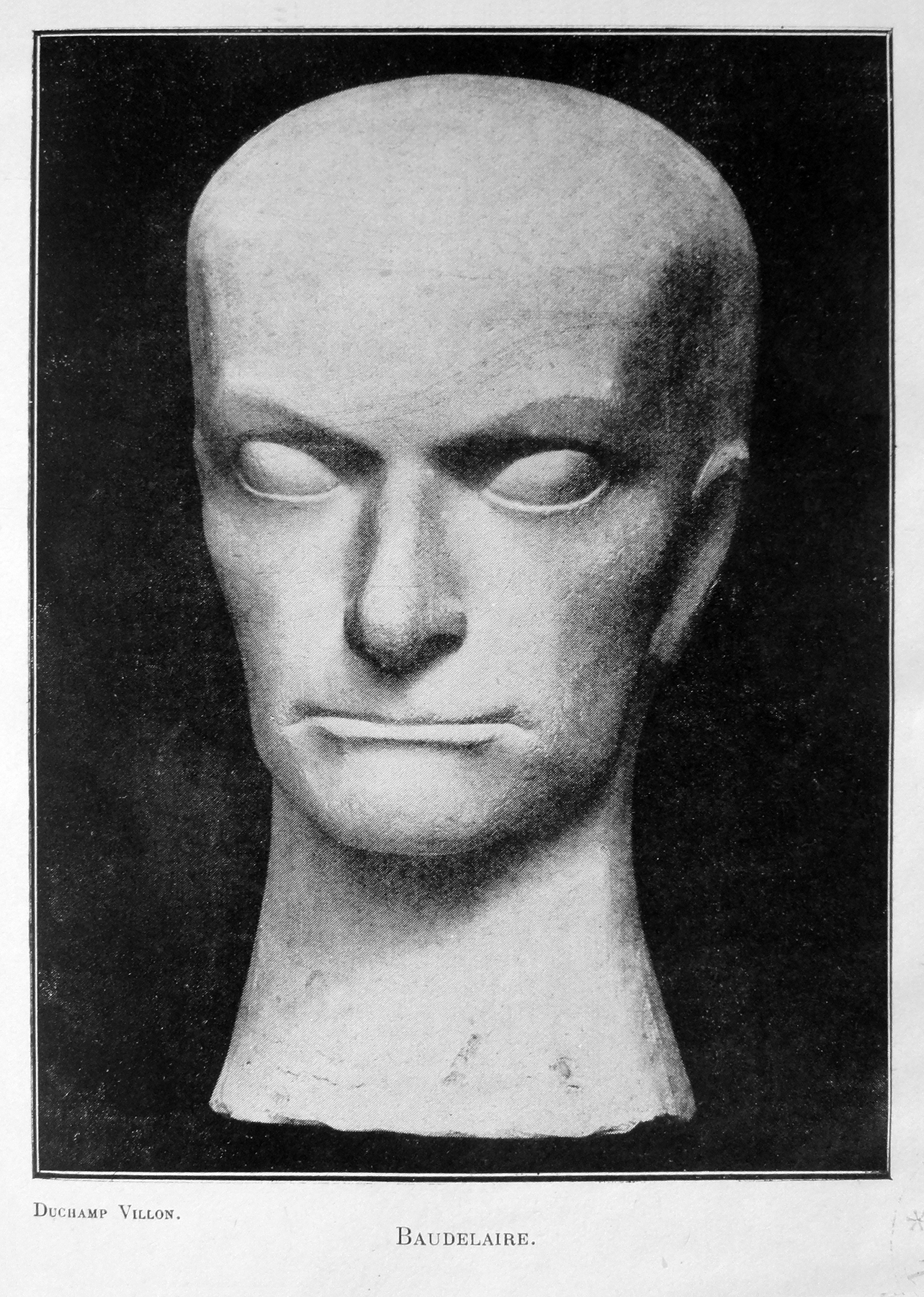
Raymond Duchamp-Villon, 1911, Baudelaire

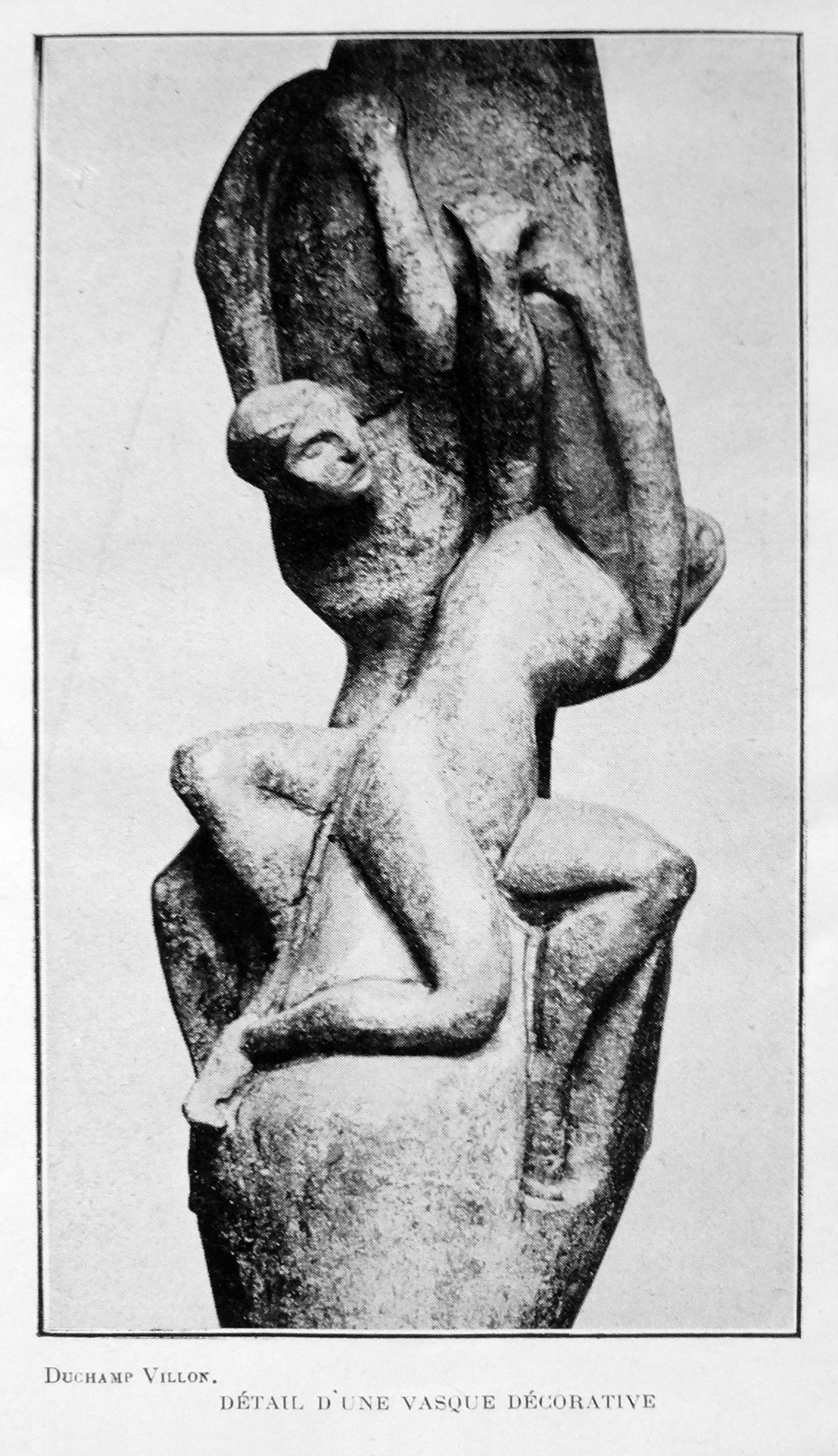
Raymond Duchamp-Villon, 1911, Vasque décorative (detail)

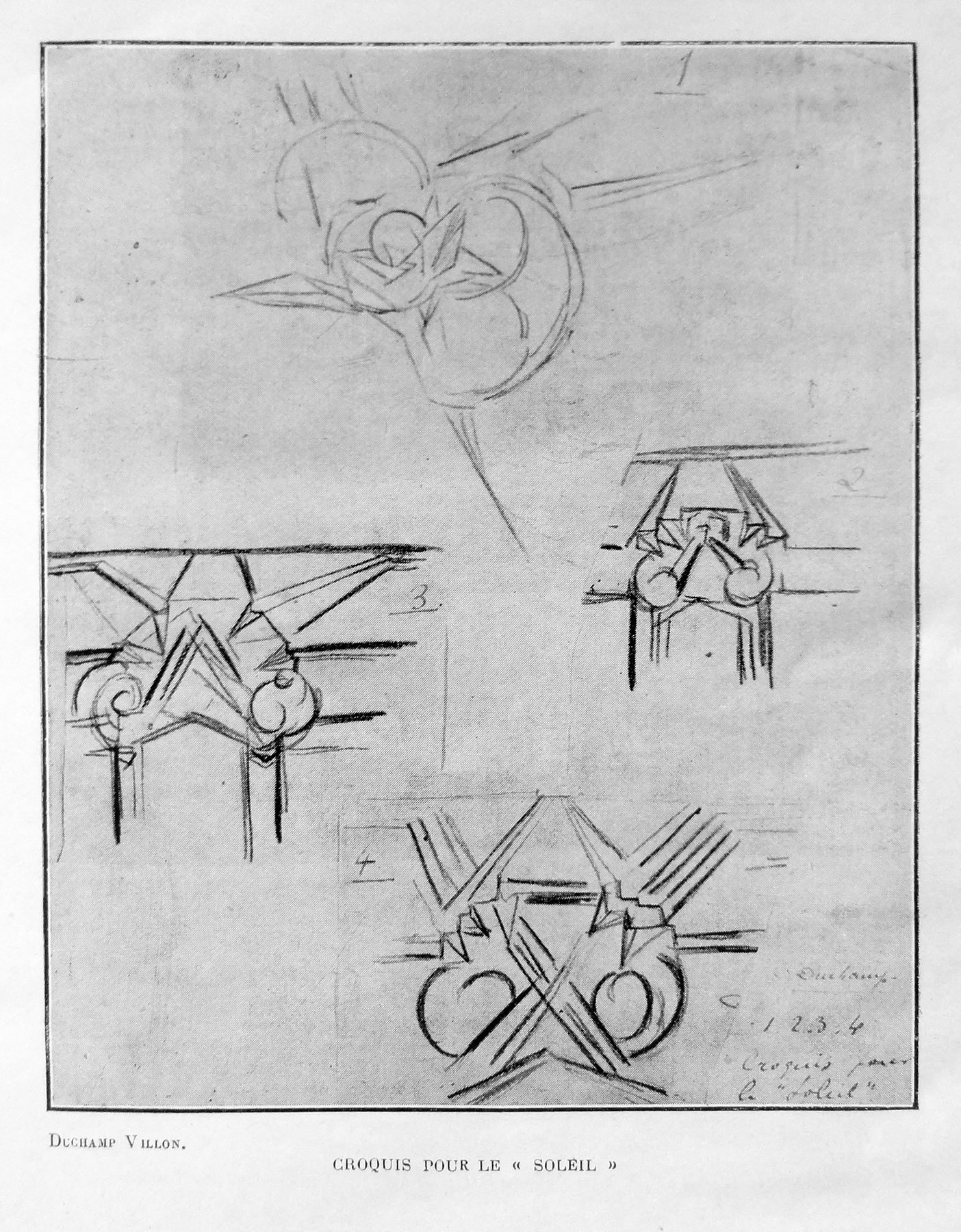
Raymond Duchamp-Villon, 1912, Croquis pour le Soleil

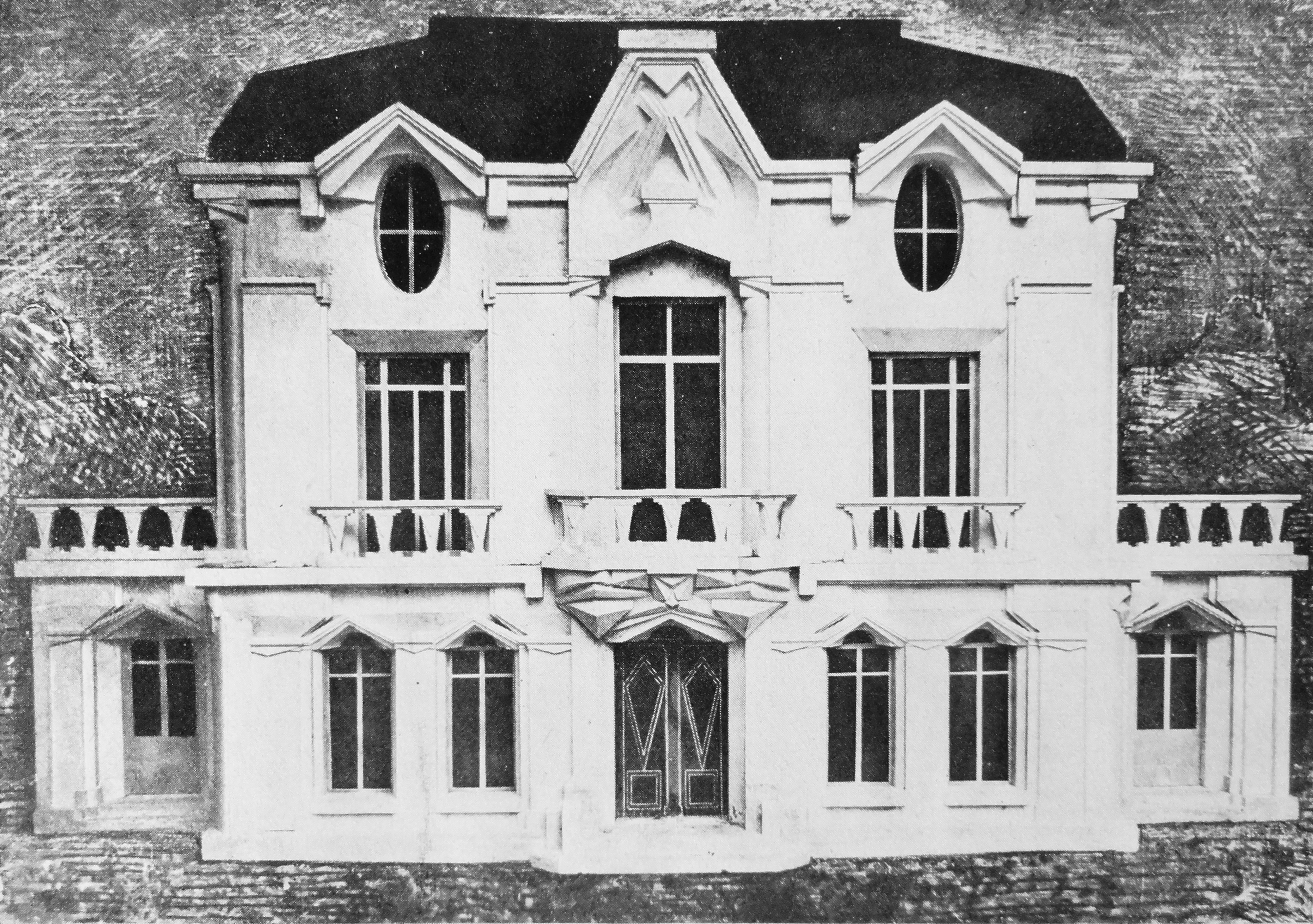
Raymond Duchamp-Villon, 1912, Study for La Maison Cubiste, Projet d'Hotel (Cubist House)

==== Note ====
Besides the artists of whom Apollinaire writes in preceding chapters, there were other artists and writers alike attached, "whether willingly or not", to the Cubist movement. Scientific Cubism was defended by Ricciotto Canudo, Jacques Nayral, André Salmon, Joseph Granié, Maurice Raynal, Marc Brésil, Alexandre Mercereau, Pierre Reverdy, André Tudesq, André Warnod, Georges Deniker, Jacques Villon, and Louis Marcoussis. Physical Cubism was supported in the press by the writers listed above, in addition to Roger Allard, Olivier Hourcade, Jean Marchand, Auguste Herbin, and Véra. Orphic Cubism was defended by Max Goth, Pierre Dumont and Henry Valensi. Certain artists associated with Instinctive Cubism were supported by Louis Vauxcelles, René Blum (ballet), Adilphe Basler, Gustave Kahn, Filippo Tommaso Marinetti, and Michel Puy. According to Apollinaire this trend included Henri Matisse, Georges Rouault, André Derain, Raoul Dufy, Auguste Chabaud, Jean Puy, Kees van Dongen, Gino Severini, and Umberto Boccioni. In addition to Duchamp-Villon, other Cubist sculptors included Auguste Agéro, Alexander Archipenko, and Constantin Brâncuși.

== See also ==
- Proto-Cubism
- Section d'Or
- Crystal Cubism
- Fourth dimension in art
