= Marie Laurencin =

French painter, poet and printmaker (1883–1956)

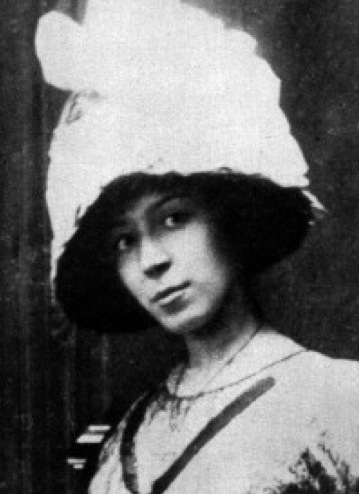
- Laurencin c. 1912
- Born: 31 October 1883; Paris, France
- Died: 8 June 1956 (aged 72); Paris, France
- Known for: Painter
- Movement: Cubism

Marie Laurencin (31 October 1883 – 8 June 1956) was a French painter and printmaker. She became an important figure in the Parisian avant-garde as a member of the Cubists associated with the Section d'Or.

== Biography ==
Laurencin was born in Paris, where she would live for most of her life. She was raised there by her mother, Pauline-Mélanie Laurencin (1861–1913), an unmarried domestic servant. Although never confirmed, Marie Laurencin believed that she had Creole heritage through her maternal grandmother, something she saw as part of her identity her whole life. Her father, fiscal administrator Alfred-Stanislas Toulet (1839–1905), visited her during her childhood and paid for her education. At 18, she studied porcelain painting in Sèvres. She then returned to Paris and continued her art education at the Académie Humbert, where she changed her focus to oil painting.

Marie Laurencin, 1909, Réunion à la campagne (Apollinaire et ses amis), oil on canvas, 130 x 194 cm, Musée Picasso, Paris. Reproduced in The Cubist Painters, Aesthetic Meditations (1913)

During the early years of the 20th century, Laurencin was an important figure in the Parisian avant-garde. A member of both the circle of Pablo Picasso, and Cubists associated with the Section d'Or, such as Jean Metzinger, Albert Gleizes, Robert Delaunay, Henri le Fauconnier, and Francis Picabia, exhibiting with them at the Salon des Indépendants (1910–1911) and the Salon d'Automne (1911–1912), and Galeries Dalmau (1912) at the first Cubist exhibition in Spain. She became romantically involved with the poet Guillaume Apollinaire, and has often been identified as his muse. In addition, Laurencin had important connections to the salon of the American expatriate and lesbian writer Natalie Clifford Barney. She had relationships with men and women, and her art reflected her life, her "balletic wraiths" and "sidesaddle Amazons" providing the art world with her brand of "queer femme with a Gallic twist." She had a forty years long love relationship with fashion designer Nicole Groult.

During the First World War, Laurencin left France for exile in Spain with her German-born husband, the artist, Baron Otto von Waëtjen, since through her marriage she had automatically lost her French citizenship. The couple subsequently lived together briefly in Düsseldorf. She was greatly affected by her separation from the French capital, the unrivaled center of artistic creativity. After they divorced in 1920, she returned to Paris, where she achieved financial success as an artist until the economic depression of the 1930s. During the 1930s she worked as an art instructor at a private school. She lived in Paris until her death.

== Work ==
Laurencin's works include paintings, watercolors, drawings, and prints. She is known as one of the few female Cubist painters, with Sonia Delaunay, Marie Vorobieff, and Franciska Clausen, although she later distanced herself from it, stating in an interview in 1923: "Cubism has poisoned three years of my life, preventing me from doing any work. [...] As long as I was influenced by the great men surrounding me, I could do nothing." While her work shows the influence of Cubist painters Pablo Picasso and Georges Braque, who was her close friend, she developed a unique approach to abstraction which often centered on the representation of groups of women and animals. Her work lies outside the bounds of Cubist norms in her pursuit of a specifically feminine aesthetic by her use of pastel colors and curvilinear forms. Originally influenced by Fauvism, she simplified her forms through the influence of the Cubist painters. From 1910, her palette consisted mainly of grey, pink, and pastel tones.

Her distinctive style developed upon her return to Paris in the 1920s post exile. The muted colours and the geometric patterns inherited from Cubism were replaced by light tones and undulating compositions. Her signature motif is marked by willowy, ethereal female figures, and a palette of soft pastel colours, evoking an enchanted world. Art history professor Libby Otto said, "Marie Laurencin is of the 'lipstick lesbian' variety: She constructs this very soft, feminine world that really spoke to viewers at the time. And if you realize that, in her soft way, she's constructing a world without men, of female harmony, there's something pretty revolutionary in there as well."

Laurencin continued to explore themes of femininity and what she considered to be feminine modes of representation until her death. Her works include paintings, watercolors, drawings, and prints.

Selected works

1910-11, Les jeunes filles (Jeune Femmes, Young Girls), oil on canvas, 115 x 146 cm. Exhibited Salon des Indépendants, 1911, Moderna Museet, Stockholm

1911, La Toilette des jeunes filles (Die Jungen Damen), black and white photograph. Exhibited at the 1913 Armory Show, New York, Chicago and Boston

1912, Femme à l'éventail (Woman with a Fan), black and white photograph published in Albert Gleizes, Jean Metzinger, Du "Cubisme", Edition Figuière, Paris, 1912

1913, Le Bal élégant, La Danse à la campagne

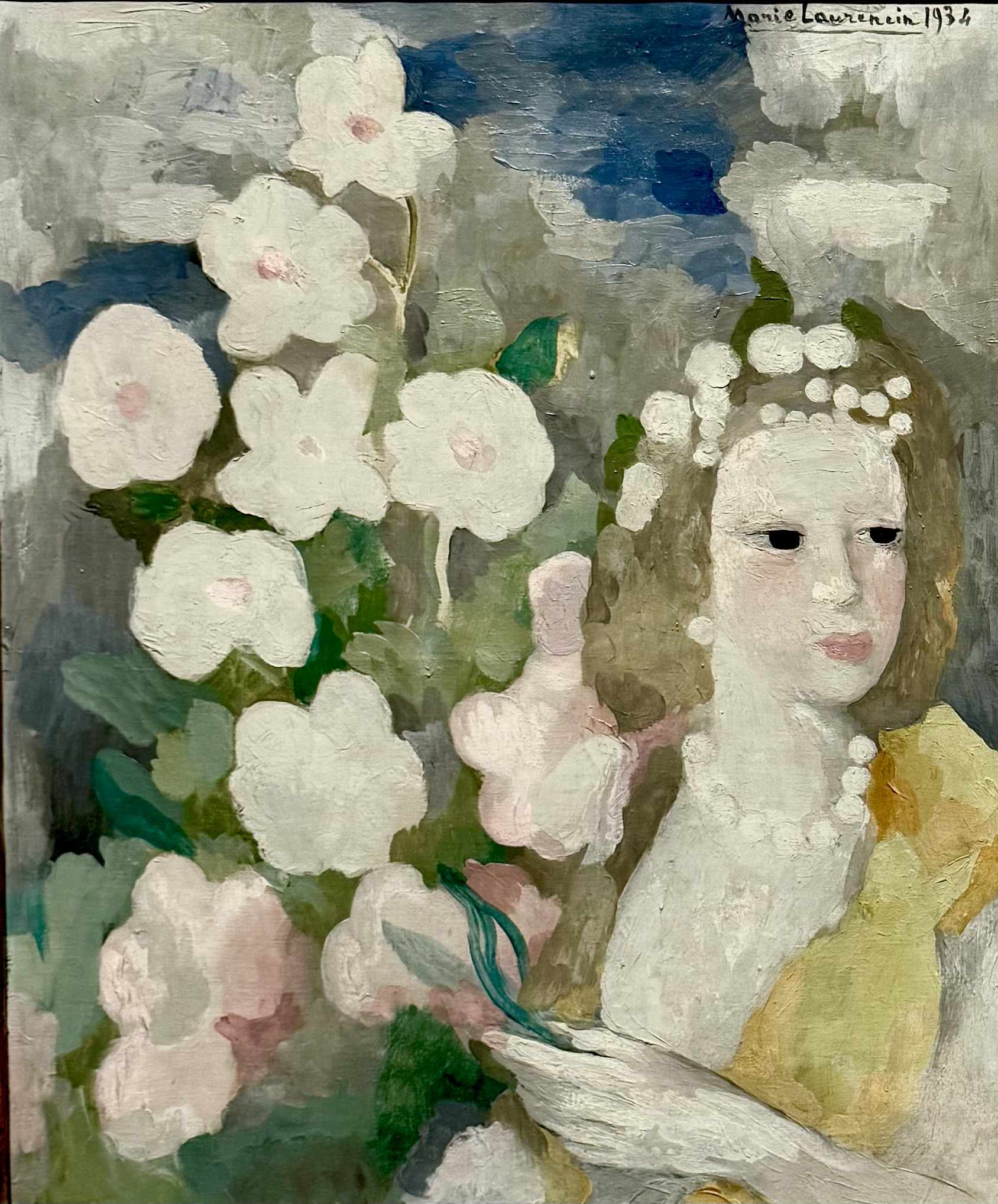
1921, Woman Holding Flowers

1921, Portrait de Jean Cocteau

1921, Woman Painter and Her Model, oil on canvas

1923, Portrait de Mademoiselle Chanel, oil on canvas

1923, Femmes au chien, oil on canvas

1924, Self-Portrait, oil on canvas

== Collections ==
Laurencin's artistic accomplishments are seen in collections around the world. On the 100th anniversary of her birth in 1983, the Musée Marie Laurencin opened in Nagano, Japan. To date, the Musée Marie Laurencin is the only museum in the world that solely contains the art of a female painter. Founder Masahiro Takano was enamored with Laurencin's sensual and lyrical worldview, and the museum holds over 600 art pieces by her.

Laurencin's work is also found in The Museum of Modern Art in New York, the Barnes Foundation in Philadelphia, the Hermitage Museum in St. Petersburg, and the Tate Gallery in London. Her work is also shown in the permanent collection of the Musée de l'Orangerie gallery in Paris, France, housing some of her most famous pieces.

In 2023, the Barnes Foundation opened a retrospective of Laurencin's work, titled Marie Laurencin: Sapphic Paris.

== See also ==
- The Spanish Dancers, a 1921 painting by Laurencin
