= Éric Colmet-Daâge =

French journalist (1948–2025)

- Born: 1948; Paris, France
- Died: August 2025 (aged 76–77)
- Education: Saint-Jean de Passy
- Occupation: Journalist

Éric Colmet-Daâge (1948 – August 2025) was a French journalist.

== Life and career ==
Born in Paris in 1948, Colmet-Daâge attended secondary school at Saint-Jean de Passy and began working for Salut les copains after a meeting with his father and Henri Cartier-Bresson. In 1967, he became assistant artistic director for the magazine Photo, where he would eventually become editor-in-chief. He also directed a column in the magazine Lui from 1975 to 2000. In 1982, he co-founded the magazine Newlook. In 2014, he was named editor-at-large for Photo.

Colmet-Daâge died in August 2025.
