= Pensionnat des Frères des écoles chrétiennes à Passy =

Former boarding school in Paris

The Pensionnat des Frères des écoles chrétiennes à Passy was a boarding school for boys located in the present-day 16th arrondissement of Paris and active between 1839 and 1905.

== History ==
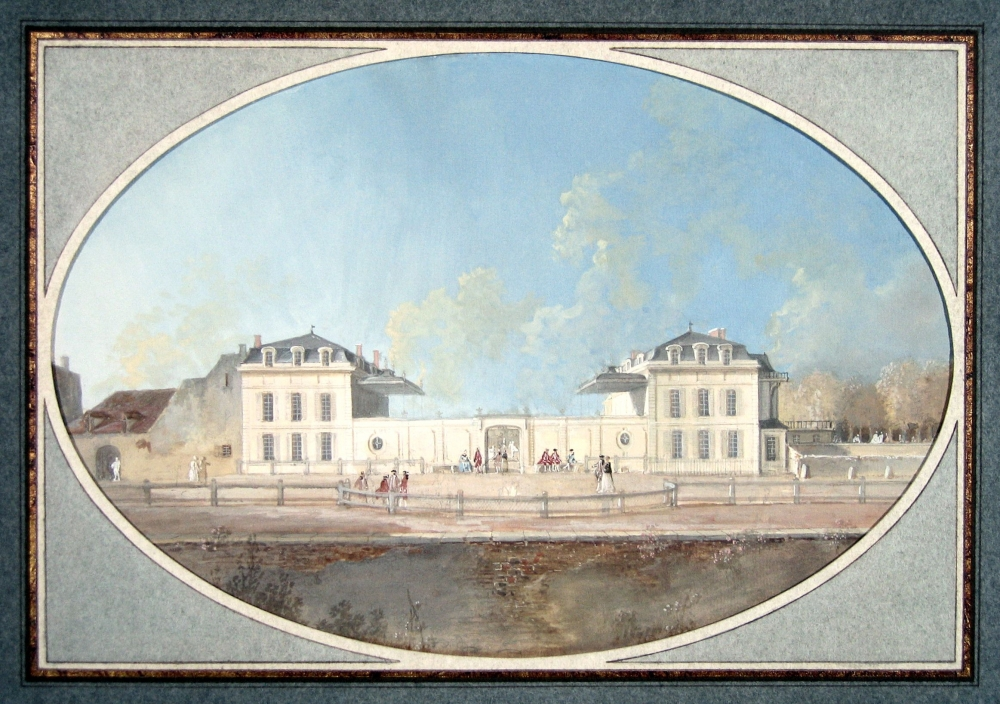
The former Hôtel de Valentinois, as painted in the 1770s by Alexis-Nicolas Pérignon bordering present-day Rue Raynouard.

In January 1837, the Brothers of the Christian Schools opened a boarding school for boys at 165 Rue du Faubourg Saint-Martin, which they transferred on 8 April 1839 to Passy (at the time a commune on the outskirts of Paris), in specially-built facilities and ones of the allotted Hôtel de Valentinois which they had possibly preserved. (Note: Auguste Doniol's claim that they had bought "les deux pavillons" (supposedly those bordering present-day Rue Raynouard), and a part of the gardens, from "M. Briant" in June 1837 possibly conflicts with Henri Bouchot's claim that Briant had owned "the back premises" (likely the orangery and adjoined buildings) "and kitchen-garden", while "the greater part, the house with the colonnades, the terraces and garden" had been owned by "writer and politician, Claude Fulchiron of Lyons", and with claims that these passed in 1811, at least in part, to banker Isaac-Louis Grivel's daughter Anne-Marie, and were sold by her husband Charles Vernes to the Brothers in 1836, another part having been bought by industrialist David Singer and opened with a street bearing his name as early as 1836.) In the following decades, the Brothers rebuilt some of the school's facilities and expanded others, as the number of boarders kept growing, despite a decrease during the French Revolution of 1848. The school buildings bordered eventually, if not from the day of its opening in Passy, all of the segment of present-day Rue Raynouard running from the corner of present-day Rue Singer to that of Rue des Vignes.

On 18 March 1864, the school (having over 700 pupils then) was visited by Minister of Education Victor Duruy, who complimented the Brothers "in the most flattering terms upon the appearance and tendency of the pensionnat". Another ministerial visit took place on 12 May of the same year,

caused by the resistance to the projet de loi for special instruction (Note: The law would be enacted on 21 June 1865.) which was manifested in the parliamentary commission which had been appointed to examine the subject. To overcome this opposition M. Duruy invited the members of the commission to accompany him to Passy, in order to demonstrate to them, as he expressed it, the successful realization of his project by the Christian Brothers.

As a law of 7 July 1904 prevented religious congregations from teaching any longer, the Brothers moved their boarding school's residence to Froyennes, Belgium in 1905. They would sell off approximately three quarters of the boarding school's buildings in Passy. (Note: The building on 12 Rue Singer was adjudicated for 162,000 francs on 27 July 1907 by the Tribunal de la Seine.) An association of fathers took advantage of the ones unsold yet disused to recreate a school, which was granted diocesan tutelage by Archbishop Léon-Adolphe Amette in 1911. It became known as "le Pensionnat diocésain de Passy".

== Notable people ==
=== Boarders ===
- Stéphane Mallarmé (between 6 or 9 October 1852 and March 1855)

=== Professors ===
- Adrien Limagne

== Sources ==
- Annuaire administratif, industriel, statistique et commercial de Passy (1858).
- Annual Report of the Commissioner of Education. U.S. Government Printing Office.
- Bouchot, Henri (1889). "Franklin à Passy". Les lettres et les arts. Boussod, Valadon et cie.
- Colloque Mallarmé (1975). Nizet.
- Documents Stéphane Mallarmé (1968). Volume 5. Nizet.
- Doniol, Auguste (1902). Histoire du XVIe arrondissement de Paris. Hachette et cie.
- Gibon, Fénelon (10 November 1907). "Encore la volatilisation d'un milliard". Le Correspondant.
- Hillairet, Jacques (1963). Connaissance du vieux Paris : les villages. Gonthier.
- Houssain, Jacques (1992). "Marcel Jouhandeau et son pensionnat". Analyses littéraires, témoignages, anecdotes. PULIM.
- Journal officiel de la République française (5 July 1911).
- Limagne, Adrien. Solfège-Manuel composé spécialement pour les cours de solfège. Volume 1.
- Prévot, André (1964). L'enseignement technique chez les Frères des écoles chrétiennes au XVIIIe et au XIXe siècles. Ligel.
- Schaeper, Thomas J. (1995). France and America in the Revolutionary Era: the Life of Jacques-Donatien Leray de Chaumont (1725-1803).
