= Nicolas Perignon =

French painter

- Born: 1726
- Died: 4 January 1782 (aged 55–56)
- Occupation: Painter, printmaker, architect, artist

Nicolas Perignon or Pérignon, also known as Alexis-Nicolas Perignon, the Elder (1726 – 4 January 1782), was a French painter, draughtsman, and engraver. He specialized in portraits, rustic scenes, landscapes, and seascapes.

Perignon was born in Nancy and died in Paris. He travelled to Italy and Switzerland, creating numerous drawings, which he later reproduced as engravings. Perignon was made a member of the Académie Royale de Peinture et de Sculpture in 1774 and exhibited mostly gouaches of country scenes at the Paris Salons of 1775, 1779, and 1781. According to Benezit, "his work is sought after."

== Gallery ==
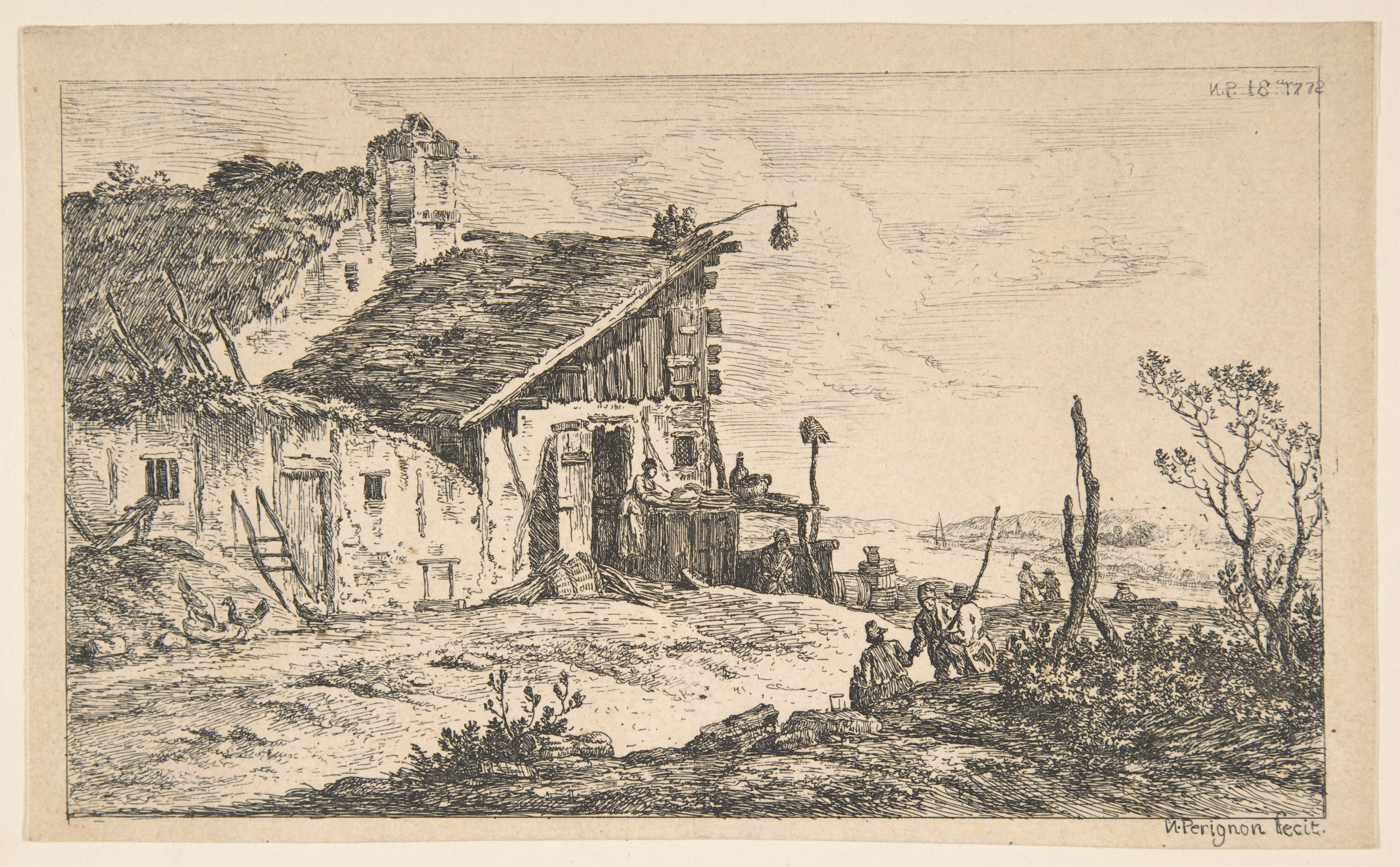
Rustic Landscape, etching at The Metropolitan Museum of Art

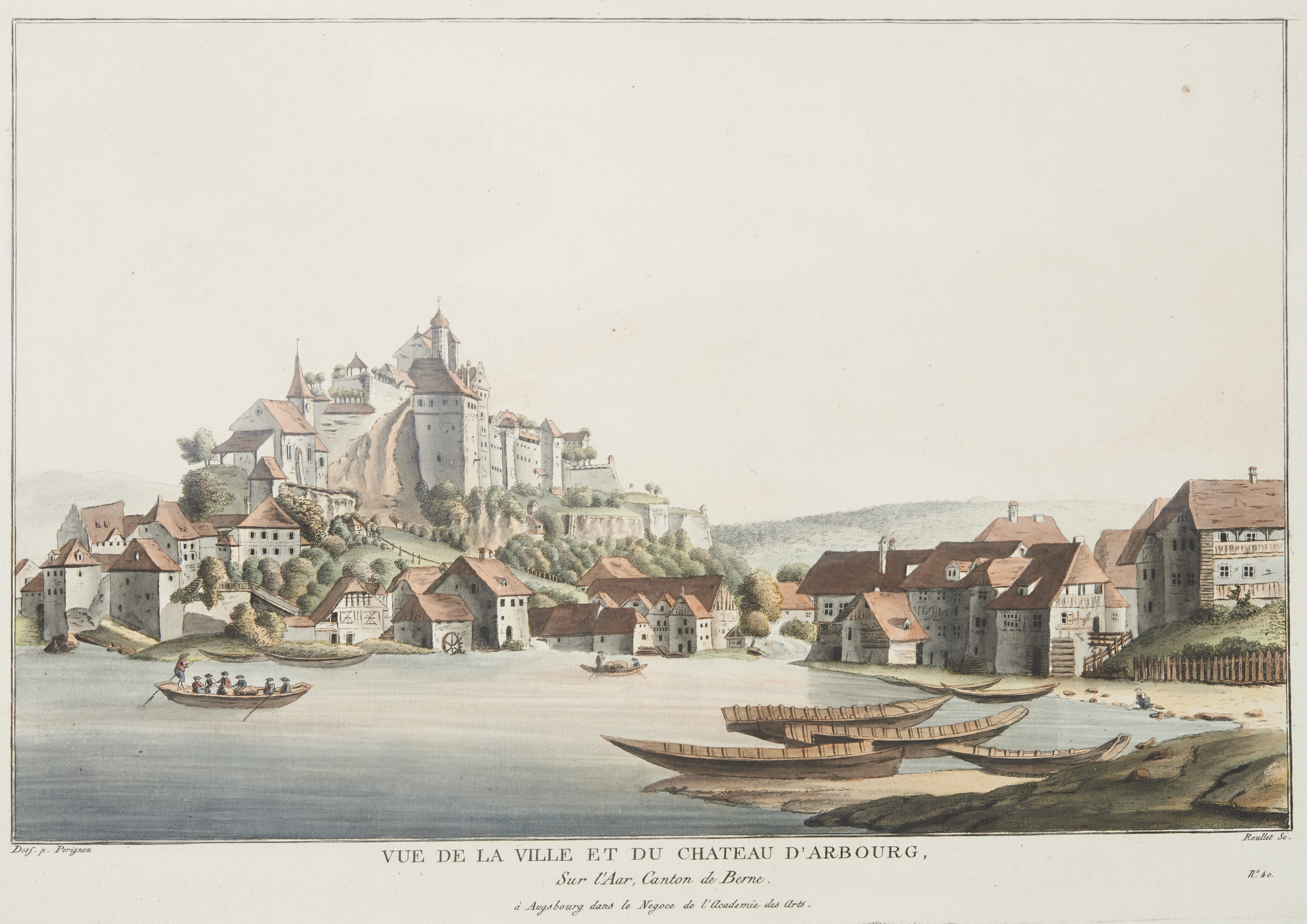
View of Aarburg, Switzerland

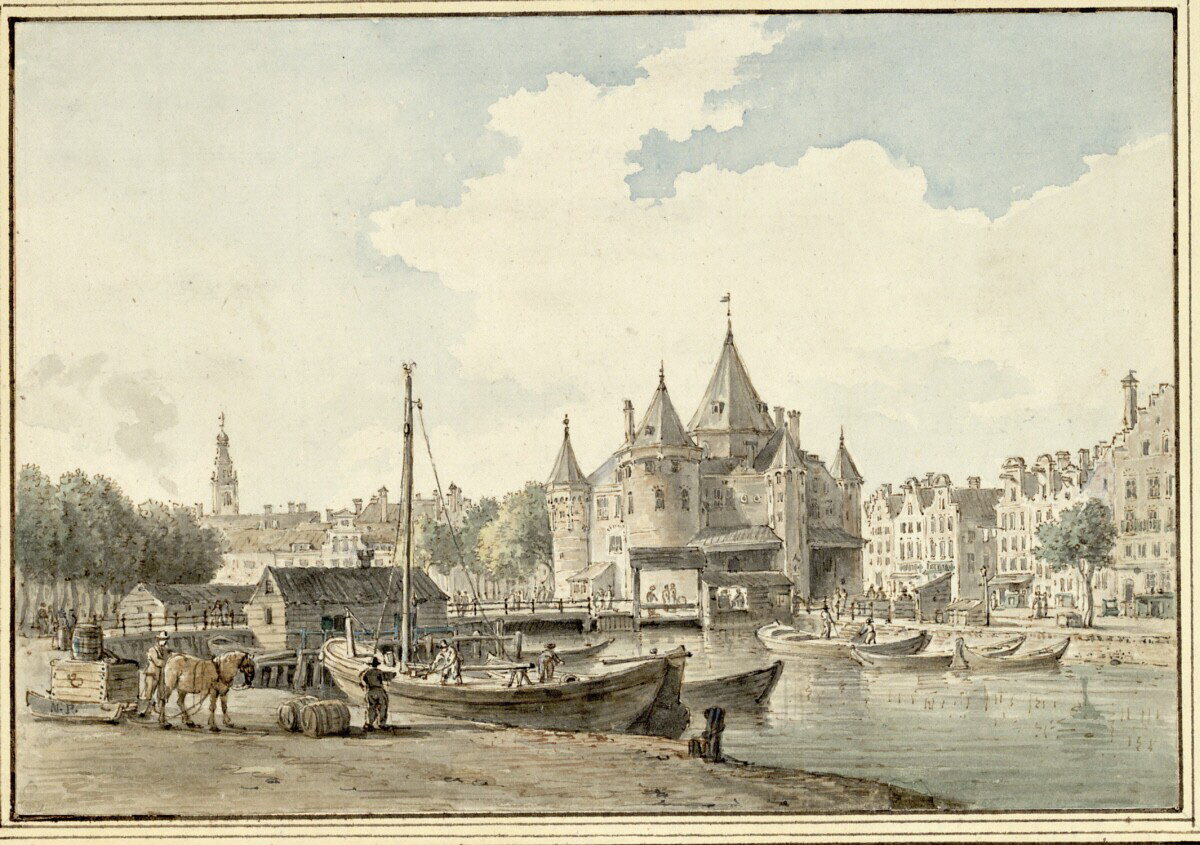
View of Amsterdam

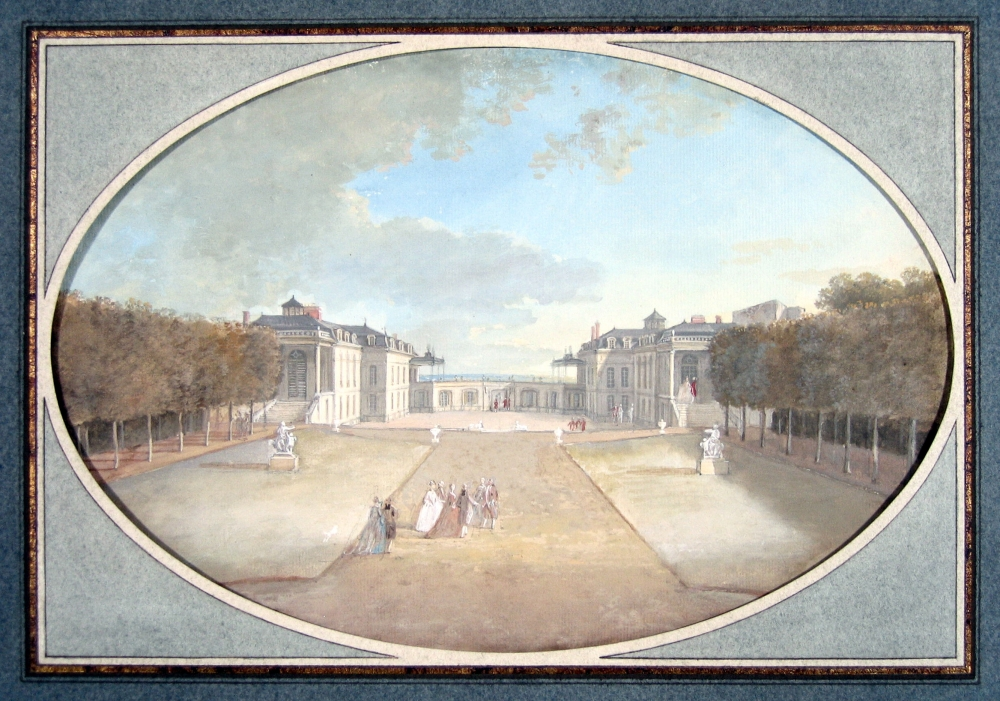
View of the Hôtel de Valentinois in Passy from the garden

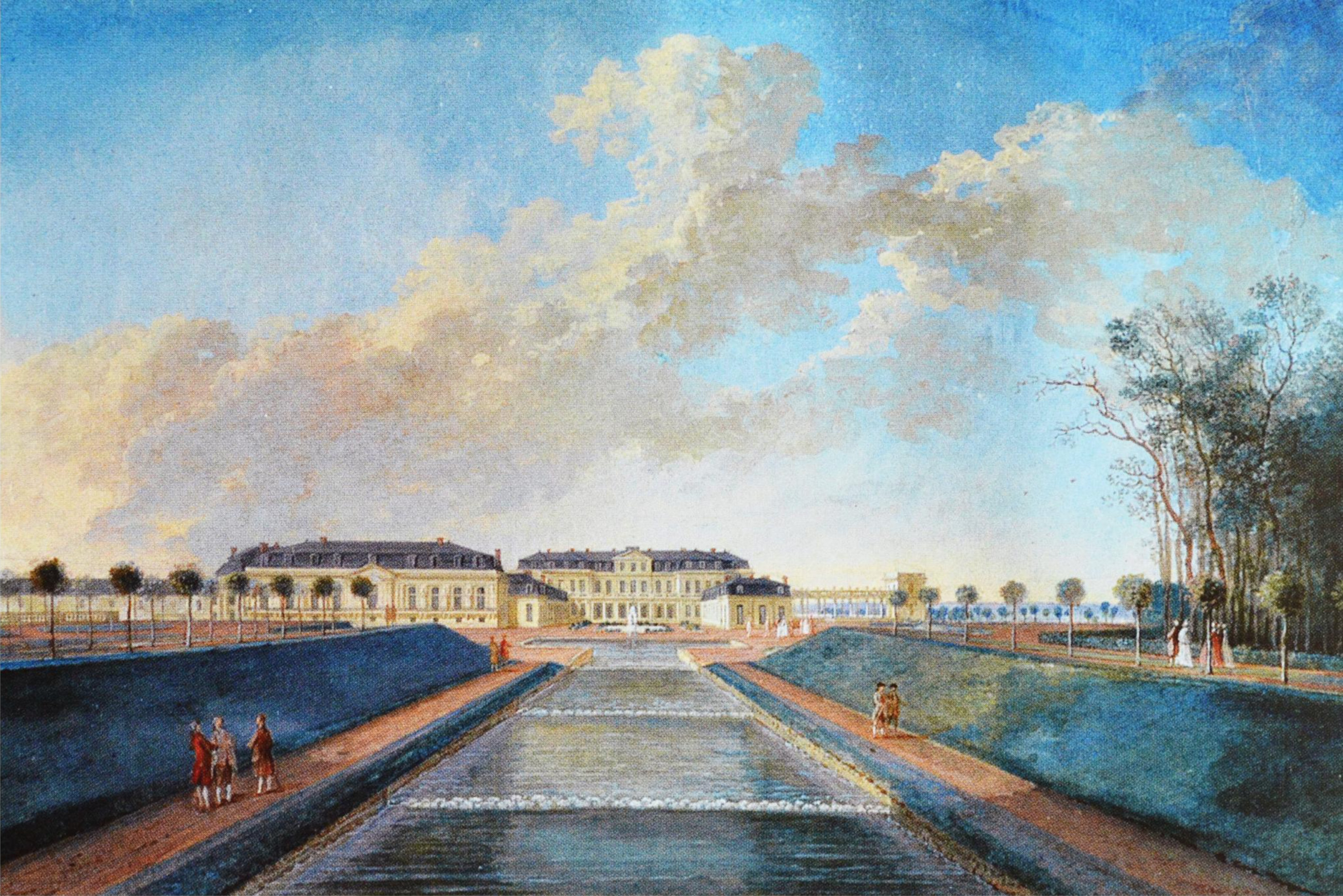
View of the garden facade of the former Château de Chanteloup in Amboise

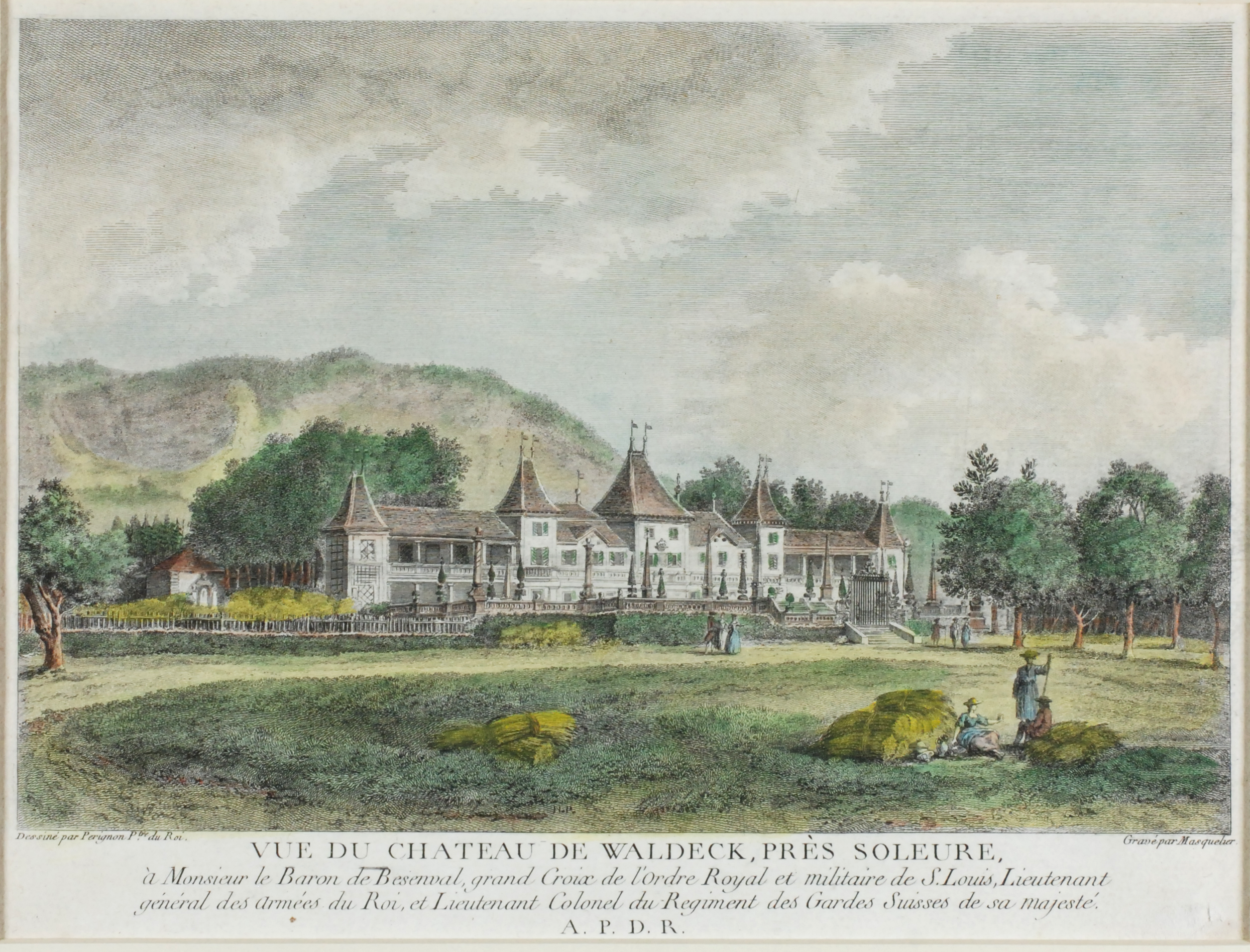
Waldegg Castle, engraving by Nicolas Perignon with dedication to Pierre Victor, Baron de Besenval, around 1785

== Bibliography ==
- Baur, J. (1990). Procès-verbaux de l'Académie royale de peinture et de sculpture, 1648-1793, Volume 9 (1780–1788). Paris: Charavay frères. Copy at Google Books.
- Benezit Dictionary of Artists (2006), vol. 10, pp. 1171–1172 ("Perignon, Alexis Nicolas, the Elder"). Paris: Gründ. ISBN 9782700030709.
- Montaiglon, Anatole de (1888). Procès-verbaux de l'Académie royale de peinture et de sculpture, 1648-1793, Volume 8 (1769–1779). Paris: Charavay frères. Copy at Google Books.
- Witt Library (2014). ("PERIGNON, Nicolas") in A Checklist of Painters c1200-1976 represented in the Witt Library, Courtauld Institute of Art, London, second edition, p. 396. New York: Routledge. OCLC 950514642.
