= Daisy Polk =

Daisy Polk (April 23, 1874 – January 22, 1963) was an American woman who became Comtesse de Buyer-Mimeure after marrying French Army General Marie Joseph Louis Robert de Buyer.

Polk was a prominent woman from San Francisco. She was the sister of architect Willis Polk and related to President Polk. Active in the American relief effort during World War I, she was assigned the reconstruction of the French village of Vitrimont, with monies supplied by Mrs. Crocker of San Francisco; Vitrimont was the first of a number of villages restored with American aid. She and de Buyer met by chance in Vitrimont in 1916: when her car broke down, de Buyer offered his assistance; a year later they were married, in September. Her husband had been in command of the 6th Light Armoured Brigade. In 1915 he became commander of the Third Cavalry Corps (France), and a year later of the Second Army Corps (France). He retired in 1917. The wedding was attended by such notables as General Pétain.

In 1920, Polk was named Chevalier of the Legion of Honour.

In the 1930s, Comtesse de Buyer-Mimeure, a well-known public figure, was active with the Catholic Sewing Circle in Passy.
