= Hôtel de Valentinois =

Former house in Passy, France

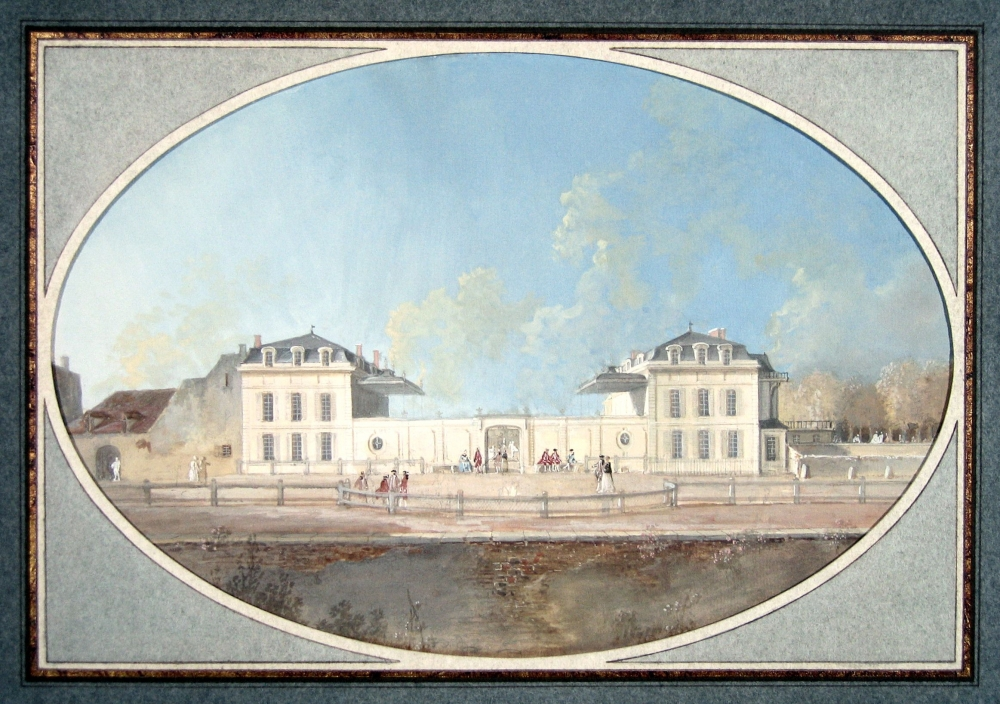
The Hôtel as painted from across present-day Rue Raynouard in the 1770s by Alexis-Nicolas Pérignon.

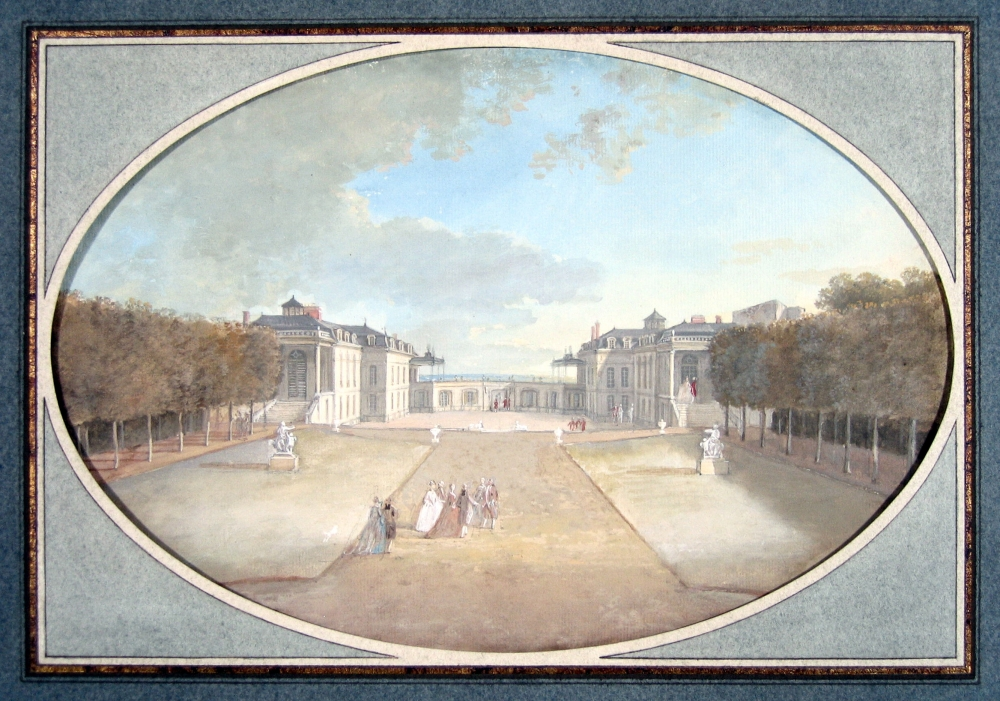
The Hôtel as painted from the center of the "parterre de gazon de quatre pièces découpées" in the 1770s by Alexis-Nicolas Pérignon.

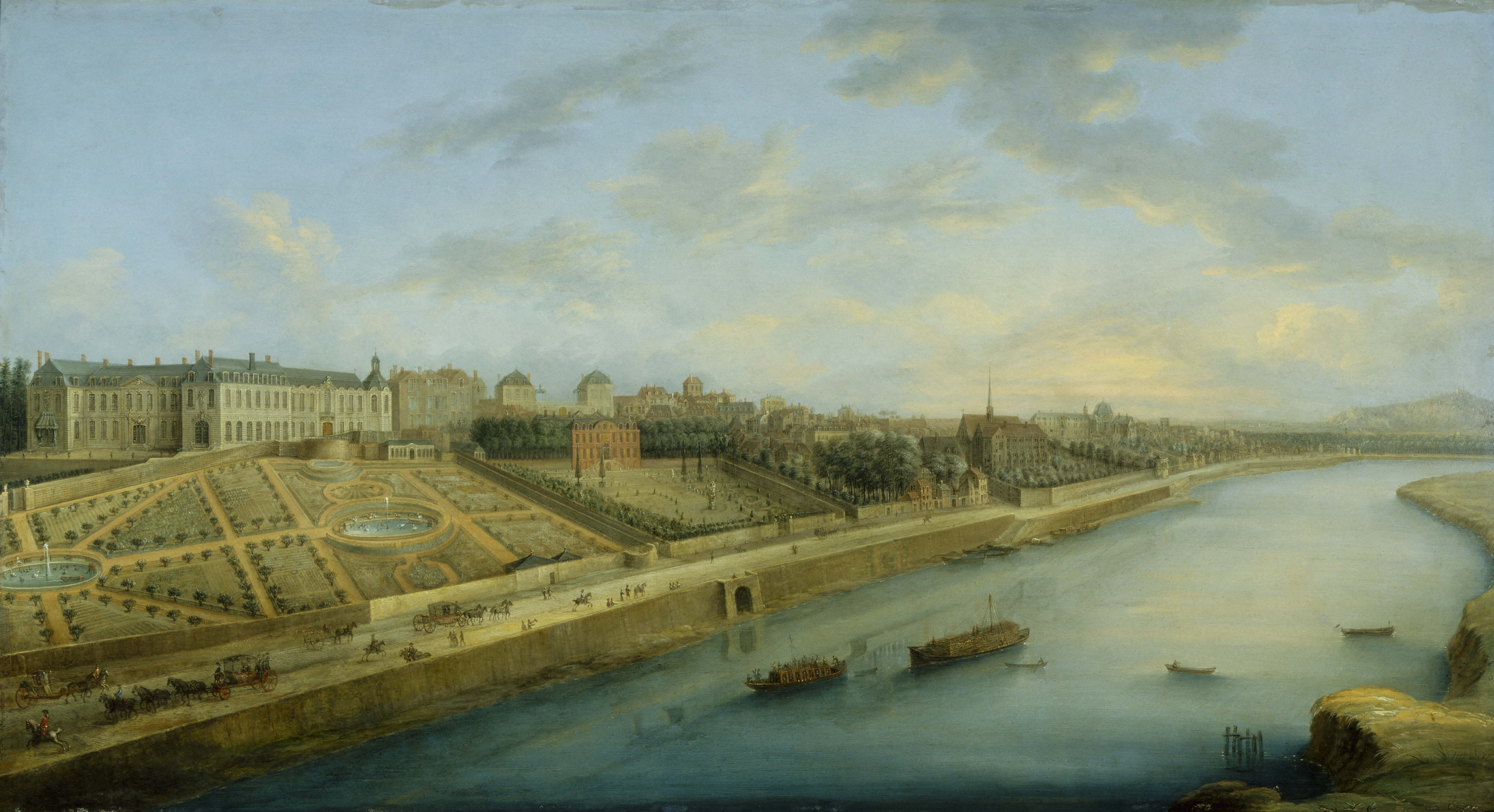
The Hôtel as painted from Grenelle in the 1740s by Charles-Léopold Grevenbroeck, standing next to the Château de Passy.

The Hôtel de Valentinois (French pronunciation: [otɛl də valɑ̃tinwa]) was an hôtel particulier, a kind of large townhouse of France, in Passy, bordering at its greatest extent present-day Rue Raynouard, present-day Rue des Vignes (opposite to Château de Passy), Rue Bois-le-Vent, to present-day Rue de l'Annonciation.

The Hôtel was last owned by Jacques-Donatien Le Ray de Chaumont, who bought it in 1776 and rented to Benjamin Franklin the dwelling appending by the orangery, and eventually the eastern pavilion of the Hôtel.

Le Ray de Chaumont sold the Hôtel as three different lots.

Auguste Doniol's claim that in June 1837 the Brothers of the Christian Schools bought "les deux pavillons" (supposedly those bordering present-day Rue Raynouard), and a part of the gardens, from "M. Briant" seems to conflict with Henri Bouchot's claim that Briant had owned "the back premises" (likely the orangery and adjoined buildings) "and kitchen-garden", while "the greater part, the house with the colonnades, the terraces and garden" had been owned by "writer and politician, Claude Fulchiron of Lyons", and with claims that these passed in 1811, at least in part, to banker Isaac-Louis Grivel's daughter Anne-Marie, and were sold by her husband Charles Vernes to the Brothers in 1836, another part having been bought by industrialist David Singer and opened with a street bearing his name as early as 1836.

A "third lot" had fallen "to Du Mersan, the gay dramatist", comprising the commons and some remains of the garden (likely a southwestern part of it, visible on the Roussel map of Paris and its faubourgs and surroundings but not shown on the Guélin plan of the Hôtel).

On 8 April 1839, the Brothers transferred a boarding school for boys which they had opened at 165 Rue du Faubourg Saint-Martin to facilities which they had specially built on their lot of the Hôtel's grounds and possibly facilities of the allotted Hôtel which they had preserved, and which became known as "le Pensionnat des Frères des écoles chrétiennes à Passy". In the following decades, the Brothers would rebuild some of the school's facilities and expand other ones, the school buildings bordering eventually, if not from the day of its opening in Passy, all of the segment of present-day Rue Raynouard running from the corner of present-day Rue Singer to that of present-day Rue des Vignes.

== Sources ==
- Allan, Peter; Orsoni, Jean; Inguenaud, Marie-Thérèse; Dainard, J. A.; Smith, David, ed. (1998). Correspondance générale d'Helvétius. Volume 4. University of Toronto Press.
- Annuaire administratif, industriel, statistique et commercial de Passy (1858).
- Bouchot, Henri (1889). "Franklin à Passy". Les lettres et les arts. Boussod, Valadon et cie.
- D*** (1779). Voyage pittoresque des environs de Paris.
- Doniol, Auguste (1902). Histoire du XVIe arrondissement de Paris. Hachette et cie.
- Hillairet, Jacques (1963). Connaissance du vieux Paris : les villages. Gonthier.
- Schaeper, Thomas J. (1995). France and America in the Revolutionary Era: the Life of Jacques-Donatien Leray de Chaumont (1725-1803).
- Simon, Miriam; Davray-Piekolek, Renée; Lacour-Veyranne, Charlotte; Dole, Christiane (2007). Benjamin Franklin : un Américain à Paris.
