= Bagatelles and Satires =

Satirical work by Benjamin Franklin

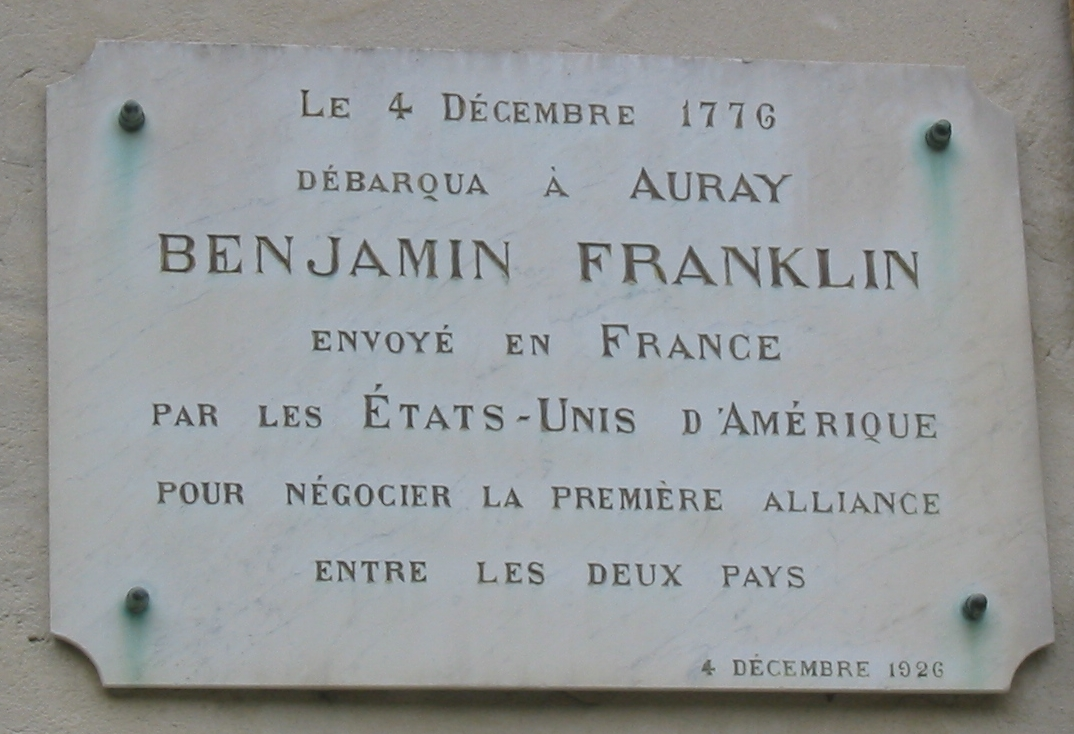

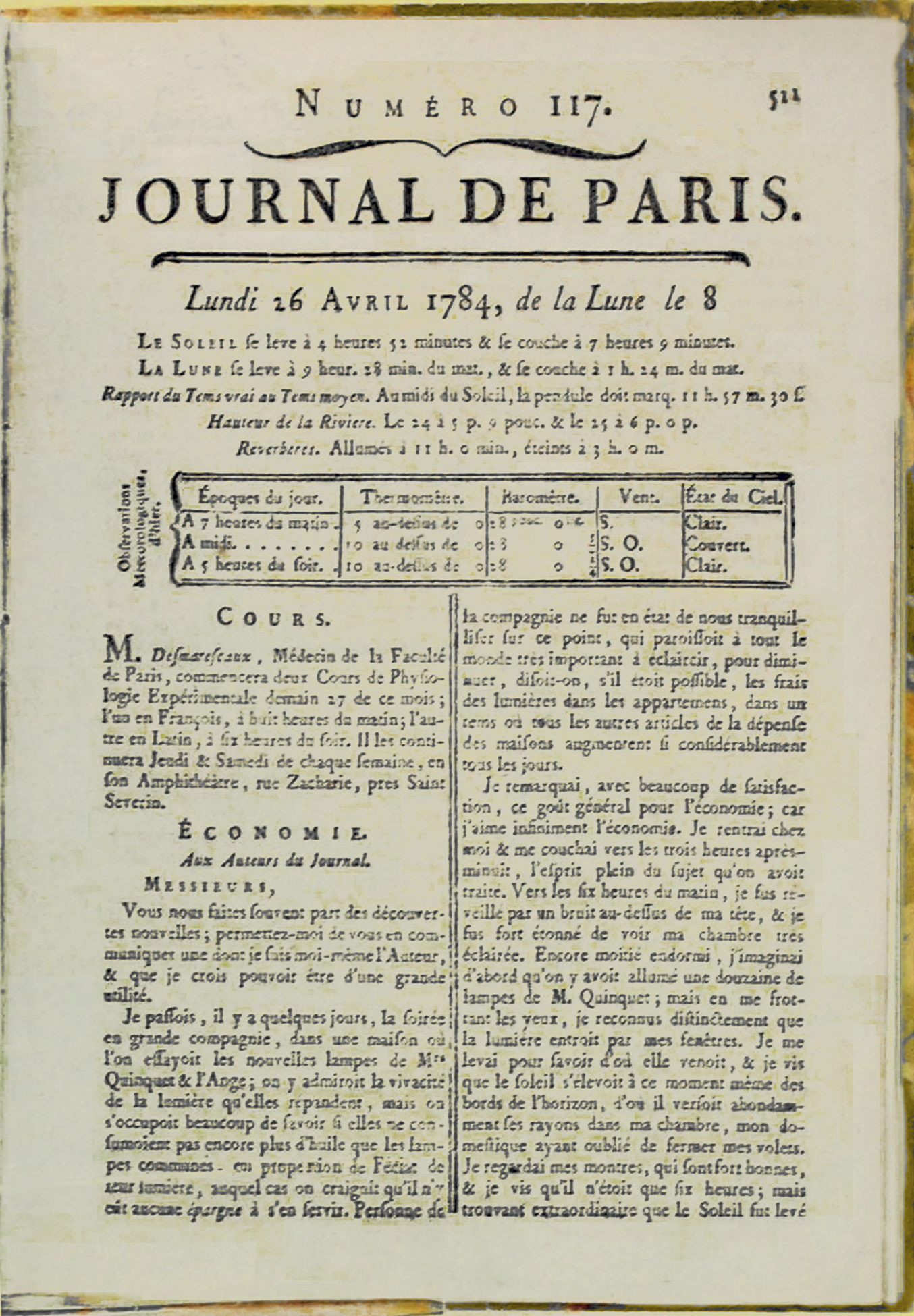

Benjamin Franklin was responsible for writing satirical comedies. His most notable humorous work is the collection called The Bagatelles.

== The Bagatelles ==
The Bagatelles, or jeux d'espirit in French, are a collection of comics produced in Franklin's Passy Press in France.

== Rules by Which a Great Empire May Be Reduced to a Small One ==
Rules by Which a Great Empire May Be Reduced to a Small One is a comedic work that Benjamin Franklin wrote in 1773. Franklin wrote it to insult the colonies' secretary of state, but wrote as if giving Machiavellian advice on how to lose an empire. Franklin pretended to advocate the tyranny that many over-imposed rulers desire as necessary to lose support of the people. For instance: to keep colonies under control, "...quarter troops among them, who by their insolence may provoke rising of mobs." (Franklin, 1773) This work also advocated poor representation of the ruler.

== Remarks Concerning the Savages of North America ==
Remarks Concerning the Savages of North America was prose, published 1784, which highlighted that just because a culture is different from your own, it shouldn't be considered as something "savage".
