= Saint-Jean de Passy =

Location
- 72 rue Raynouard; Paris; France; 48.854437°N 2.278415°E

Information
- Motto: Latin: Labor et dilectio ("Work and pious love")
- Religious affiliation: Catholicism
- Patron saint: John the Evangelist (since the 1930s)
- Founded: 1905

Saint-Jean de Passy (known as "le Pensionnat de Passy" between 1905 and 1911, and "le Pensionnat diocésain de Passy" between 1911 and its second change of name in the 1930s) is a private Catholic school located in the 16th arrondissement of Paris. It enrolls students from the first to the twelfth grades, as well as a small number of postgraduates.

== History ==
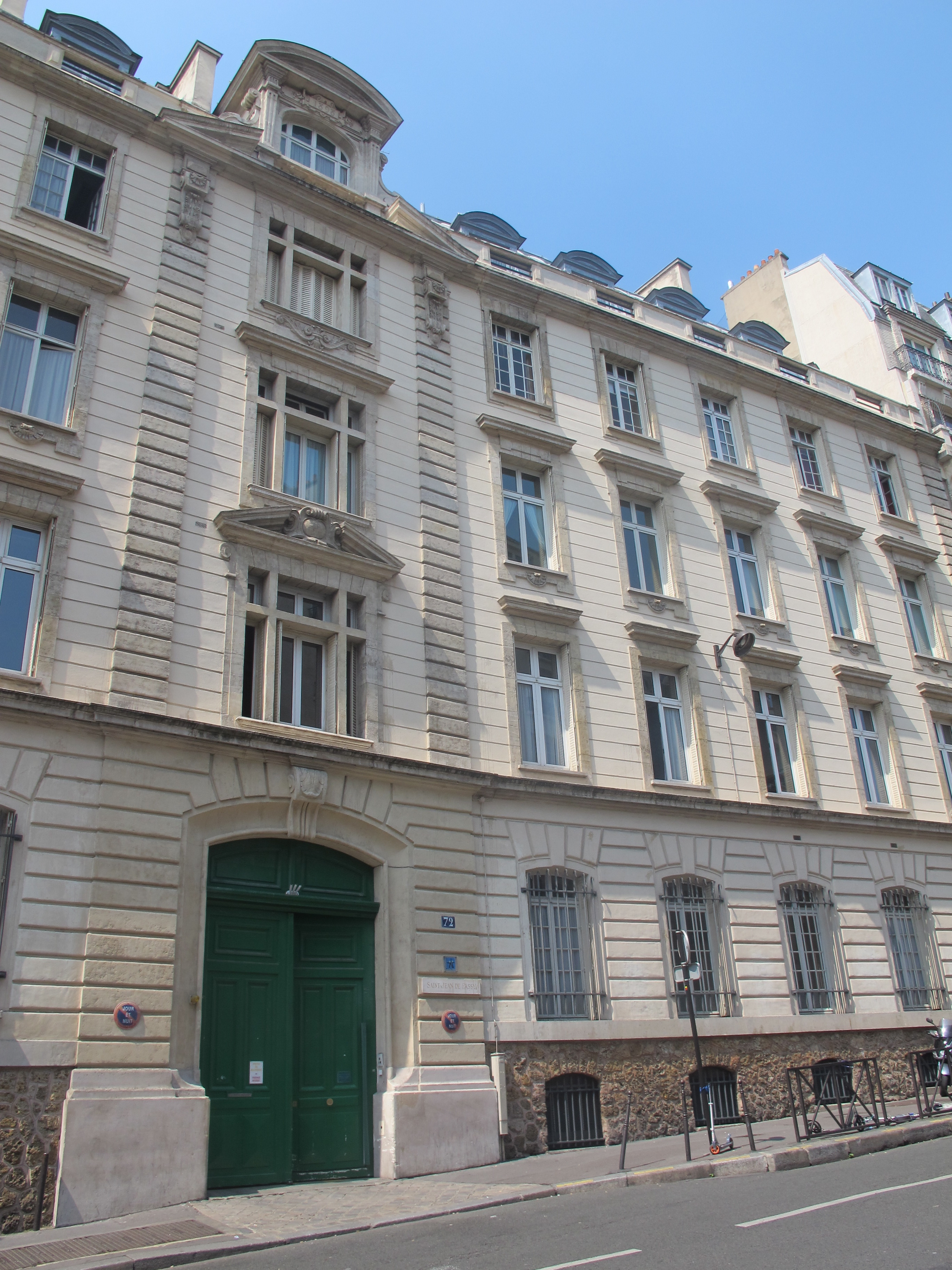
Entrance to Saint-Jean de Passy from Rue Raynouard.

In 1905, an association of fathers took advantage of the disused buildings of the Brothers of the Christian Schools' former boarding school in Passy (the Pensionnat des Frères des écoles chrétiennes à Passy) to recreate a school, the Brothers having moved their boarding school's residence to Froyennes, Belgium, as a law of 7 July 1904 prevented religious congregations from teaching any longer.

This new school was granted diocesan tutelage by Archbishop Léon-Adolphe Amette in 1911, and became known as "le Pensionnat diocésain de Passy". After the Archdiocese of Paris helped the school avoid bankruptcy by purchasing shares of the school management company in 1933, the school renamed itself "Saint-Jean de Passy" in tribute to Archbishop Jean Verdier.

The primary school was opened to girls in 1981. Middle school classes for girls were set in 2001, as well as mixed high school classes later in the decade, the latest all-boy high school classes graduating in 2007.

== Academics ==
The school has an elementary school, middle school and high school as well as preparatory classes for the grandes écoles. Saint-Jean de Passy is one of the most prestigious French schools(7th in 2016, 6th in 2017) alongside Henri-IV, Louis-le-Grand, Stanislas or its long-time historical rival Lycée Saint-Louis de Gonzague.

== Notable people ==
=== Alumni ===
Hyacinthe Cheyrou, Oscar Picot Moras D'aligny, Guillermo Chambin Moscoso Del Prado, Grégoire Fèvre.

== Sources ==
- Houssain, Jacques (1992). "Marcel Jouhandeau et son pensionnat". Analyses littéraires, témoignages, anecdotes. PULIM.
- Le Journal (12 September 1906).
