= Passy, Bridges of Paris =

Painting by Albert Gleizes

- Les ponts de Paris (Passy) (French)
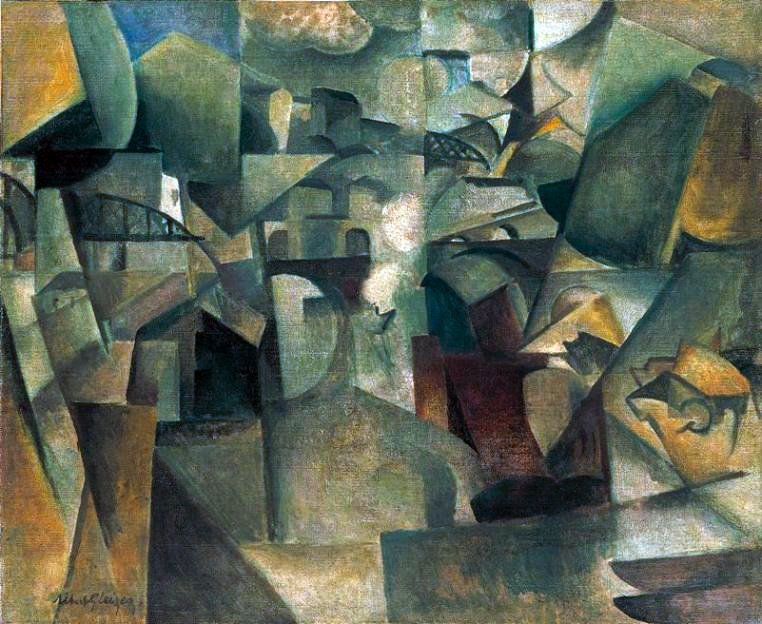
- Artist: Albert Gleizes
- Year: 1912
- Medium: Oil on canvas
- Dimensions: 60.5 cm × 73.2 cm (23.82 in × 28.82 in)
- Location: Museum Moderner Kunst (Mumok); Vienna

Passy, Bridges of Paris, also called Les ponts de Paris (Passy), or Paysage à Passy, is a painting created in 1912 by the French artist, theorist and writer Albert Gleizes. The work was exhibited at the Salon de la Société Normande de Peinture Moderne, Rouen, 1912 (titled Passy); the Salon de la Section d'Or, Galerie La Boétie, Paris, 1912 (titled Passy); Manes Moderni Umeni, Vystava, Prague, 1914 (titled Paysage à Passy); and Galerie Der Sturm, Berlin, July, 1914.

Passy was one of a small group of works chosen to be reproduced in the seminal treatise Du "Cubisme", written by Albert Gleizes and Jean Metzinger in 1912 and published by Eugène Figuière the same year. Executed in a highly personal Cubist style with multiple viewpoints and planar faceting, this is one of a number of paintings from 1912-13 involving the theme of the bridge in an urban landscape.

In opposition to classical perspective as a mode of representation, Gleizes employed a new spatial model based in part on the pictorial space of the mathematician Henri Poincaré.

This painting, in the collection of the Museum Moderner Kunst (mumok), Vienna, probably refers to the spirit of solidarity among the newly formed "Artists of Passy", during a time when factions had begun to develop within Cubism.

== Description ==
Passy (Bridges of Paris) is an oil painting on canvas with dimensions 60.5 x 73.2 cm (23.8 by 28.8 inches), signed and dated Alb Gleizes, 1914, lower left.

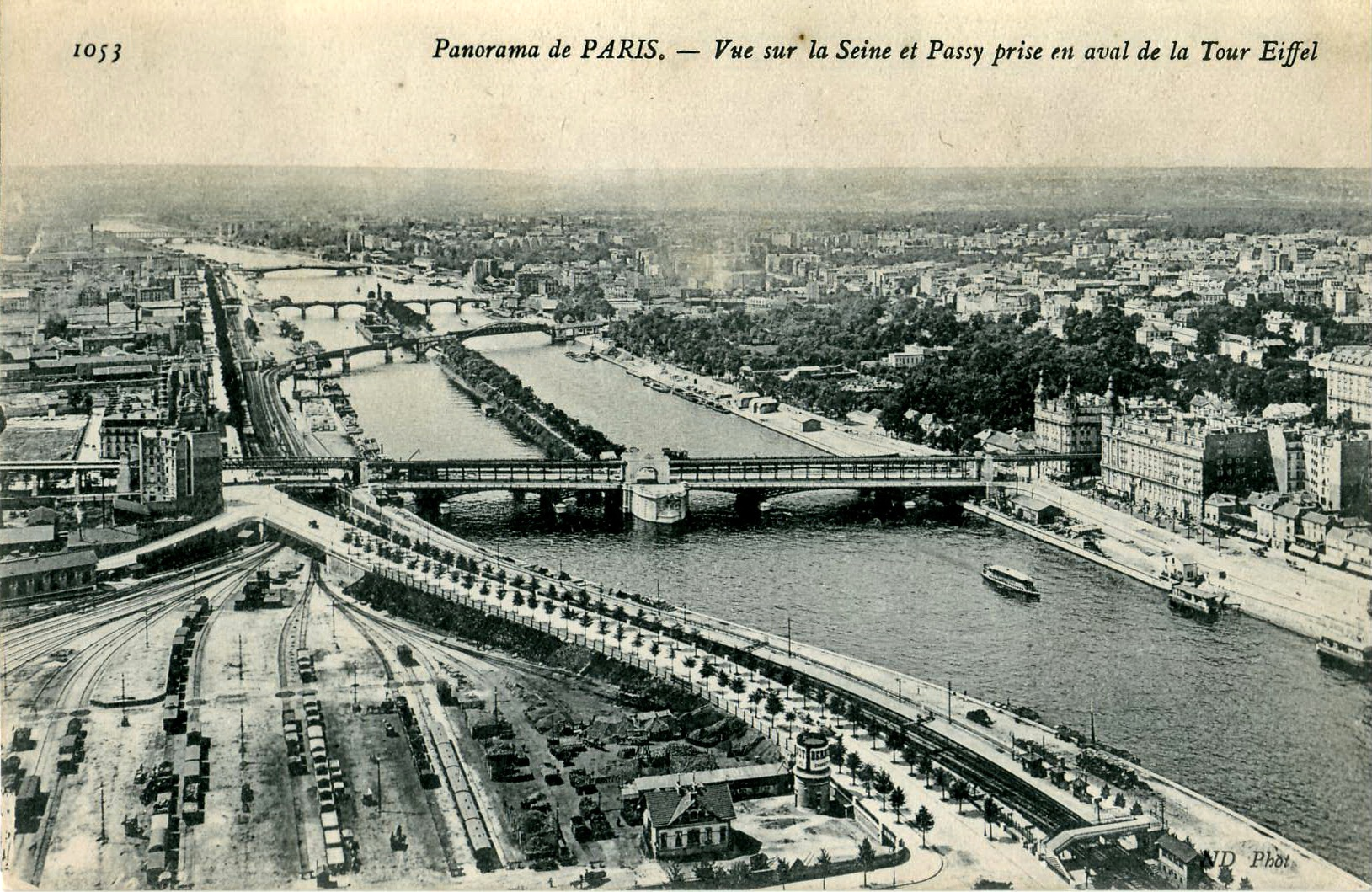
Panorama of Paris, View of la Seine and Passy seen from downstream of the Eiffel Tower. In the foreground, the former Champ de Mars train station, followed by the Pont de Passy. Postcard image taken from the 2nd level of the Eiffel Tower

The works represents an upscale cartier de Paris known as Passy located in the 16th arrondissement of Paris, one of the most wealthy districts of the French capital, and traditionally the home of well-known personalities, including Honoré de Balzac, Benjamin Franklin during the nine years that he lived in France, William Kissam Vanderbilt, and the artist Jacques-Emile Blanche.

Les Artistes de Passy was a diverse grouping of avant-garde artistes (painters, sculptors and poets), including several who previously held meetings in 1910 at the rue Visconti studio of Henri Le Fauconnier. Their first diner (Premier dîner des Artistes de Passy) presided over by Paul Fort was held at the house of Balzac, rue Raynouard, in the presence of Guillaume Apollinaire, Jean Metzinger, Albert Gleizes, Raymond Duchamp-Villon, Marie Laurencin, Henri Le Fauconnier, Fernand Léger, André Mare, Francis Picabia, Henry Valensi, and Jacques Villon. Albert Gleizes chose to Passy as the subject of this painting.

Instead of depicting a bowl of fruit or a man playing a guitar under the influence of African art, Gleizes turns toward a non-Euclidean model of geometry as a source of inspiration for Passy. This work signified the rejection of Euclidean geometry and its correlate; the quantitative measurement of spatial depth governing perspective invented during the Renaissance, an unquestioned principle of academic painting that had persisted to date.

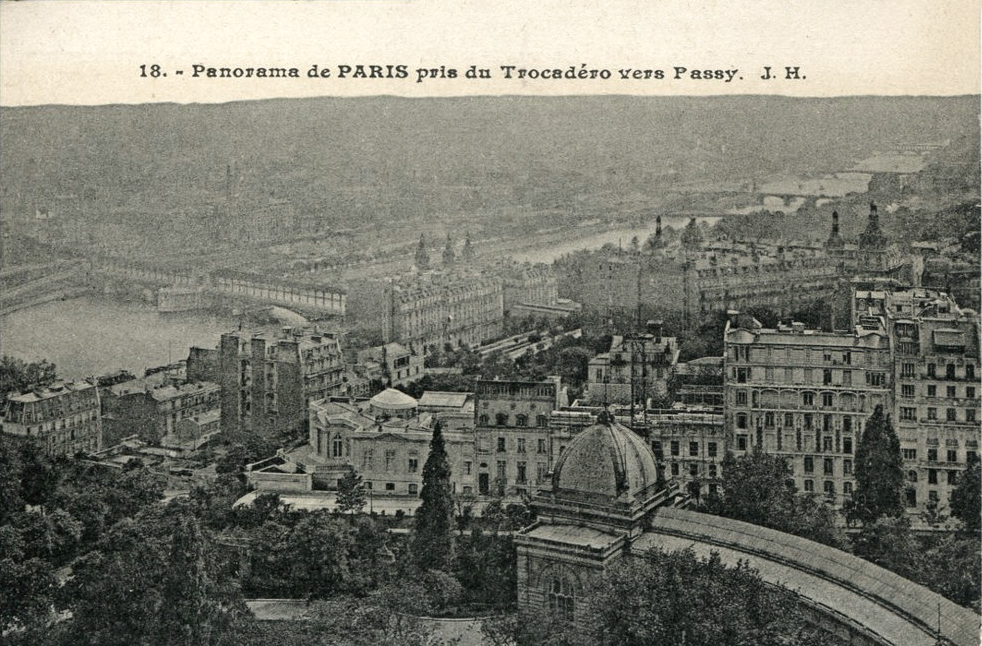
Panorama of Paris, view from the Trocadéro towards Passy (postcard early 1900s)

Vanishing points have been abolished. A perspectival grid is gone. Forms are not clearly delineated. Colors are synthetic and limited, not overpowering. Light and reflected light do not come from a consistent unidirectional source. There is no precisely clear relationship between structures (e.g., buildings, bridges) based on overlapping or on diminished scale with distance to show depth of field as objects recede from the foreground. Here Gleizes brakes all the rules. Perhaps for this reason Passy was chosen as an example of new painting for publication in their manifesto; Du "Cubisme".

== Background ==
Antliff and Leighten write of Passy (Ponts de Paris) in Cubism and Culture:

Instead of this [academic] spatial model, Cubists turned to new models of geometry and the 'fourth dimension' as inspiration for the works like Gleizes's Passy (Ponts de Paris) of 1912, which he and Metzinger reproduced in their tract Du Cubisme as exemplary of art expressing their ideas. This urban landscape synthesized the river, trees, clouds, buildings, steel bridges and smoke of the modern city. Partially geometrized forms—such as the green arc of tree on the upper left or arched doors and windows on the rectangular buildings in the center—are subjectively evoked through limited colour range; shifting perspectives, signified by long vertical and diagonal bands cutting off the edges of objects contained within them; and shifting relative scales of objects, such as the two steel bridge spans. [...] the Cubists justified this novel approach to pictorial space in part on the basis of the mathematician Henri Poincaré's theory of 'conventionalism'.

The existence of a fourth dimension, according to Poincaré, could not be ruled out by observation alone. "If the number of dimensions comes from the way in which we are made", Poincaré hypothesized, "there might be thinking beings living in our world, but made differently from us, who would think that space has more or less than three dimensions."

Thus the characteristic property of space, that of having three dimensions, is only a property of our distribution board, a property residing, so to speak, in the human intelligence. The destruction of some of these connections that is to say of these associations of ideas, would be sufficient to give us a different distribution board, and that might be enough to endow space with a fourth dimension. (Poincaré, 1897)

Poincaré stressed the importance of understanding the relativity of space. Space is in reality amorphous, according to Poincaré, only things that occupy space give it a form:

One part of space is not by itself and in the absolute sense of the word equal to another part of space, for if it is so for us, it will not be so for the inhabitants of the universe B, and they have precisely as much right to reject our opinion as we have to condemn theirs.

I have shown elsewhere what are the consequences of these facts from the point of view of the idea that we should construct non-Euclidean and other analogous geometries. (Poincaré, 1897)

Consistent with the view of Poincaré, Euclidean geometry represented one configuration among many equally valid geometric models that Gleizes could have chosen. With this newfound liberty, he was free to transform Passy in accord with his own subjectivity. This radical break from classical conventions was not without its parallel in Nietzschean free will and freedom of expression. In an essay on the Cubism of Metzinger published September 1911, Gleizes wrote of his compatriot as a disciple of the philosopher Friedrich Nietzsche who 'invents his own truth' by destroying 'old values'.

Since the classical Euclidean notion of 'fixed' absolute space explicitly informed the fictive 'moment' of absolute time, the Cubists jettisoned the idea of placing the observer at a privileged spatial position at a fixed moment in time. Now, according to the theoretical deliberations of Gleizes and Metzinger, artists were free to move around the subject matter, depicting multiple views 'simultaneously', whereby several successive moments in time could be captured and projected onto the canvas at once. In the process, the 'total image' produced over a period of time was more complete than a single instantaneous view.

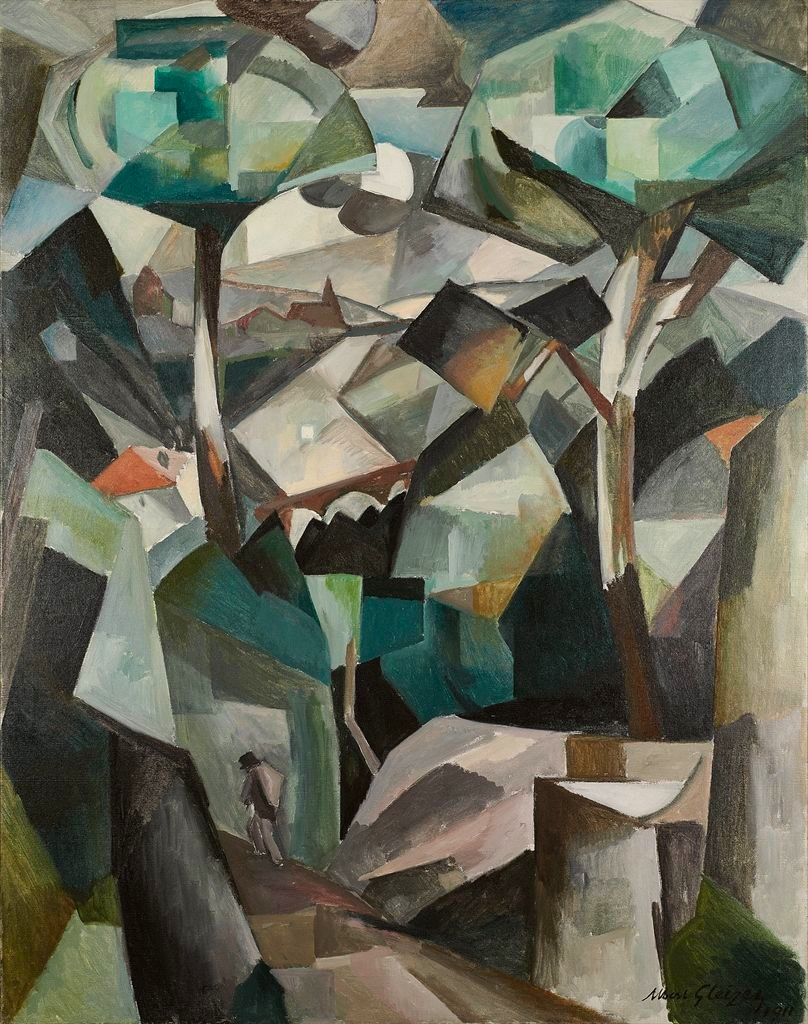
Albert Gleizes, 1911, Le Chemin, Paysage à Meudon, Paysage avec personnage, oil on canvas, 146.4 × 114.4 cm. Exhibited at Salon des Indépendants, 1911, Salon des Indépendants, Bruxelles, 1911, Galeries Dalmau, Barcelona, 1912, Galerie La Boétie, Salon de La Section d'Or, 1912

Fernand Léger, 1911, Les Toits de Paris (Roofs in Paris), oil on canvas, private collection. Reproduced in Du "Cubisme", 1912

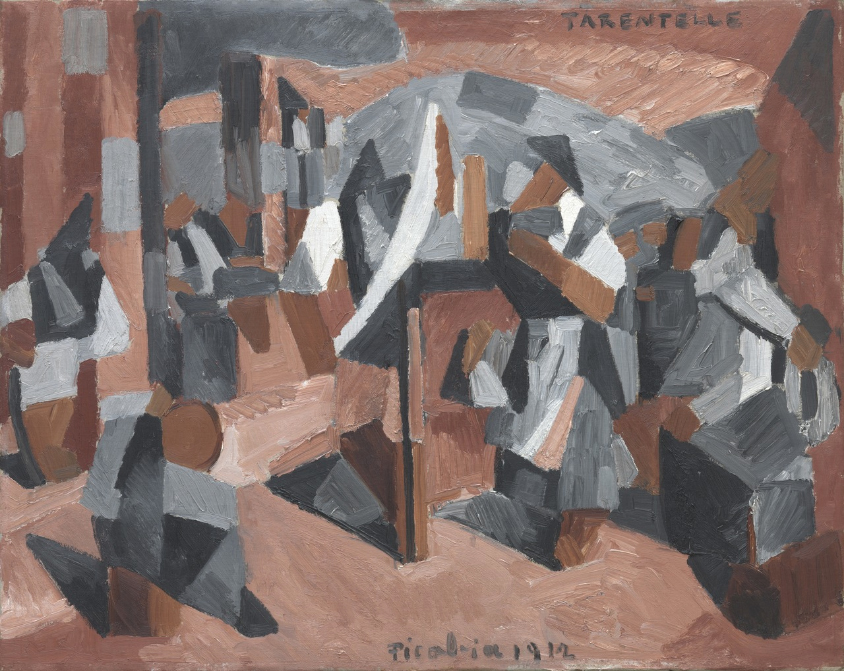
Francis Picabia, 1912, Tarentelle, oil on canvas, 73.6 × 92.1 cm, Museum of Modern Art, New York. Reproduced in Du "Cubisme"

The intervention of memory in the process of representation was an important criterion for Henri Poincaré (as it would be too for the philosopher Henri Bergson, post-Symbolist writers and Gleizes himself):

Besides, we have to make a representation, not of a complexus of simultaneous sensations, but of a complexus of successive sensations, following one another in a determined order, and it is for this reason that I said just now that the intervention of memory is necessary. (Poincaré, 1897)

"Absolute space exists no longer" writes Poincaré; "there is only space relative to a certain initial position of the body".

We define a point by the succession of movements we require to make to reach it, starting from a certain initial position of the body. The axes are accordingly attached to this initial position of the body.

But the position I call initial may be arbitrarily chosen from among all the positions my body has successively occupied. If a more or less unconscious memory of these successive positions is necessary for the genesis of the notion of space, this memory can go back more or less into the past. Hence results a certain indeterminateness in the very definition of space, and it is precisely this indeterminateness which constitutes its relativity.

Memory would play an important role in Les Ponts de Paris (Passy), as it did in Gleizes' Le Chemin (Paysage à Meudon), Portrait of Jacques Nayral, painted in 1911, Man on a Balcony of 1912, and Portrait de l’éditeur Eugène Figuière, of 1913: Both the content and form in these paintings were the result of mind associations as he completed the works from memory; something that would play a crucial role in the works of other Cubists, such as Fernand Léger, Robert Delaunay and Francis Picabia.

== Cubist factions ==
Disparate inspirations during a proto-Cubist phase had already yielded several related methods of expressing the geometric experience (what Gleizes and Metzinger would soon attribute to mobile perspective). Cubism was in the eye of the beholder; it could be seen as a process, a system, a state of mind, an inspired attitude that would develop a new symbolic structure, a reflection of the changing world.

Despite their similarities, works produced by diverse artists were neither homogeneous nor isotropic. This venture was essentially nonlinear. Cubism was omnidirectional, growing like a tree with many branches. The progression of each artist was unique. Even when paths would cross, artists would not necessarily fall under one another's influence. Despite a growing awareness, a 'collective consciousness' based on a nonacademic passion for structure and mobility, and despite the sense of group unity that would attain a maxima circa 1912, deep-seated differences arose sporadically, often fueled by critics and dealers.

In Albert Gleizes, 1881-1953, A Retrospective Exhibition, Solomon R. Guggenheim Museum curator and art historian Daniel Robbins writes of Passy:

A synthesis of the modern city with its smoke, river and steel bridges, this work probably refers also to the spirit of solidarity among the newly formed "Artists of Passy". In this sense it indicates an awareness of factions within Cubism. (Robbins, 1964)

Georges Braque, Violin: "Mozart Kubelick", 1912, oil on canvas, 45.7 x 61 cm, Metropolitan Museum of Art

The participation of many artists, in addition to Metzinger, Gleizes and the Duchamp brothers, in the formation of the association Les Artistes de Passy in October 1912 was an attempt to transform the Passy district of Paris into yet another art-centre; a further sign of a growing emphasis on communal activity that would culminate in the Section d'Or exhibition. Les Artistes de Passy was a further sign too, as Robbins points out, of the growing rift that separated the Salon Cubists (Metzinger, Gleizes, Le Fauconnier, Delaunay, Léger and others) from the Gallery Cubists (Picasso and Braque). There was a distinct difference between the Salon Cubists and Kahnweiler’s Cubists. The latter had mostly been seen by a small group of artists and connoisseurs in a small private gallery, generating only modest reviews in the press, while the impact of the Salon group in the printed press and general public was enormous. Kahnweiler had exclusivity contracts with his artists and sold only to a small circle of collectors from his small "boutique" (Gleizes' term) comparatively hidden behind La Madeleine. Works of the Salon Cubists were seen by tens of thousands of spectators during well-publicized, conspicuous and prominent events such as the Salon d'Automne and Salon des Indépendants. Picasso and Barque were kept away from the Salons by Kahnweiler for fear of ridicule and for financial reasons (exclusivity guaranteed commission).

Metzinger's Le goûter (Tea Time) "was far more famous than any painting that Picasso and Braque had made up until this time; because Picasso and Braque, by not showing at the Salons, have actually removed themselves from the public... For most people, the idea of Cubism was actually associated with an artist like Metzinger, far more than Picasso." (Michael Taylor, 2010, Curator Philadelphia Museum of Art)

Pablo Picasso, 1913, Bouteille, clarinette, violon, journal, verre, 55 x 45 cm. This painting from the collection of Wilhelm Uhde was confiscated by the French state and sold at the Hôtel Drouot in 1921

While financial support from Kahnweiler's gallery sales gave Picasso and Braque the freedom to experiment in relative privacy, the highly publicized Salon Cubists were free to experiment in public and sell works directly from their studios and Salons.

The immense Cubist manifestation called Salon de la Section d'Or of 1912 (an exhibition organized by Metzinger, Gleizes and the Duchamp brothers) took place at the centrally located Galerie de la Boétie in a prominent gallery district of Paris. This gallery showing by Salon Cubists may have been seen as a threat by Kahnweiler, since it marked the beginning of decades of personal attacks targeting artists not associated with his gallery.

At stake, beyond commercial speculation and financial profit, were the questions of when Cubism began, who led the way in its development, what distinguishes Cubist art, how it can be defined and who can be called Cubist. By marginalizing the contribution of the artists who exhibited at the Salon des Indépendants and Salon d'Automne, Kahnweiler's attempted to focus attention on Picasso and Braque, those who played a leading if independent role in the development of this new mode of expression. To some extent Kahnweiler had succeeded in his endeavor, prompting historians such as Douglas Cooper to coin the term ‘true’ Cubism to describe the work of Picasso and Braque. The implied value judgement was intentional.

This restricted view of Cubism has since been replaced by more contemporary alternative interpretations of Cubism, more complex and heteroclite; formed to some degree in response to the more publicized Salon Cubists, whose methods were too distinct from those of the Gallery Cubists to be considered merely secondary to them.

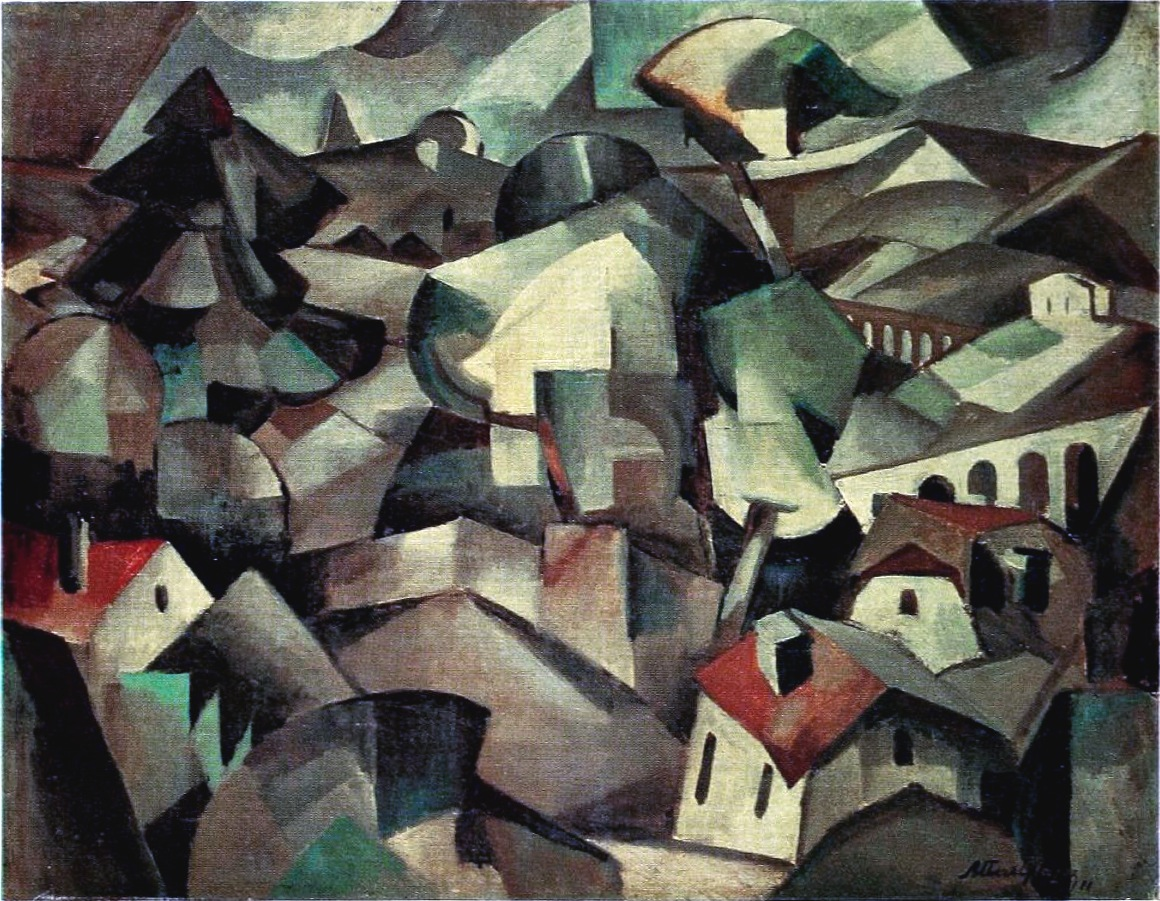
Albert Gleizes, 1911, Paysage (Landscape), oil on canvas, 71 x 91.5 cm. Reproduced frontispiece catalogue Galeries Dalmau, Barcelona, 1912

Salon Cubists produced a different kinds of Cubism. It is not clear to what extent these Cubists depended on Picasso and Braque for their development of such techniques as faceting, ‘passage’ and multiple perspective. They could well have arrived at such practices with little knowledge of Picasso and Braque, guided by their own understanding of Cézanne. The works produced by these other Cubists exhibited at the 1911 and 1912 Salons extended beyond the conventional Cézannian range of subjects chosen by Picasso and Braque to include large-scale allegoric and modern-life subjects. "Aimed at a large Salon public", writes art historian Christopher Green, "these works made clear use of Cubist techniques of faceting and multiple perspective for expressive effect in order to preserve the eloquence of subjects that were richly endowed with literary and philosophical connotations". The Salon Cubists were attuned to the philosopher Henri Bergson's notion of ‘duration’, according to which life is subjectively experienced as a continuous forward movement in time, with the past flowing into the present and the present merging into the future. In Du "Cubisme" Gleizes and Metzinger explicitly related this sense of time to multiple perspective. "The one major innovation that one can be sure was made independently by the Salon Cubists, that of ‘simultaneity’, came of a conviction also rooted in their understanding of Bergson that the divisions of space and time should be comprehensively challenged." Green continues: "The conjunction of such subject-matter with simultaneity aligns Salon Cubism with early Futurist paintings by Umberto Boccioni, Gino Severini and Carlo Carrà; these Italian works, though themselves made in response to early Cubism, led the way in the application of techniques of simultaneity in 1911–12".

'What is necessary', writes Gleizes, 'is to take everything up again from the foundations and to start out from the unquestionable reality of two currents which, unaware of each other, were finally enfolded under a single heading, the movement that was called 'Cubism'. You can then avoid confusion if, right from the start, you make the distinctions that must, in all honesty, be acknowledged. The history of the 'Bâteau Lavoir' belongs to those who were part of that particular grouping. Personally, I only know what has been said about this history; I do not know the details, nor did my comrades of the other group Metzinger, Delaunay, Le Fauconnier and Léger... But what I do know well, because I lived it and remember it perfectly, is the origin of our relations and their development to 1914, passing by the notorious Room 41 of the Indépendants of 1911, which provoked the 'involuntary scandal' out of which Cubism really emerged and spread in Paris, in France and through the world... (Albert Gleizes

Gleizes continues in an unpublished 1917 paper:

Speculators with their own interests and the idiocy [sottise] of painters who played their game created a legend which up to now has never openly been challenged. It proclaimed that the entire movement of plastic art of our time had been thrown into confusion by the discoveries above-mentioned. Their inventor was made into the pivot of the movement which was being built. Everything came from him, he had foreseen everything and outside his genius the rest was nothing but pastiche and followers. The truth, however, is that it was the appearance of a group that gave the twist of the helm to the new aspirations. It was not the work of an isolated figure who presided over the mystery of a boutique, who surrounded himself with thick veils and acted on some sniffer dogs [flaireurs] and dupes, but rather the brutal appearance in broad daylight of a coherent group [ensemble homogène] who did not claim to be displaying masterpieces but wanted to witness a fervent discipline, a new order. [...] On one side, the talk was all of the moderns and the negroes, on the other it was of the cathedrals and the solidity [sureté] of David and Ingres. (Albert Gleizes)

== Provenance ==
- Sidney Janis Gallery, New York
- Museum des 20. Jahrhunderts, Vienna

== Exhibitions ==
- Société Normande de Peinture Moderne, Rouen, 15 June - 15 July 1912 (no. 91, titled Passy)
- Salon de la Section d'Or, Galerie La Boétie, Paris, 10–30 October 1912 (no. 41, titled Passy)
- Manes Moderni Umeni, Vystava, Prague, February - March 1914 (no. 35, titled Paysage à Passy)
- Der Sturm, Berlin, July, 1914.
- Kunst von 1900 bis Heute, Museum des 20. Jahrhunderts, Vienna, 1962, no. 58.
- The Solomon R. Guggenheim Museum, Albert Gleizes 1881 – 1953, A Retrospective Exhibition, The Solomon R. Guggenheim Foundation, New York. This exhibition traveled to Musée National d'Art Moderne, Paris, Museum am Ostwall, Dortmund, 1964-1965

== Literature ==
- Albert Gleizes and Jean Metzinger, Du "Cubisme", Paris, 1912, p. 105.
- Apollinaire, G. Paris-Journal, 1914, (cf. Chroniques d'Art, 1960, p. 405).
- Golding, J. Cubism, London, 1959, p. 158.

== See also ==
- List of works by Albert Gleizes
