= Passy =

Neighborhood in the 16th arrondissement of Paris, France

Coordinates: 48°51′25.60″N 2°17′02.89″E

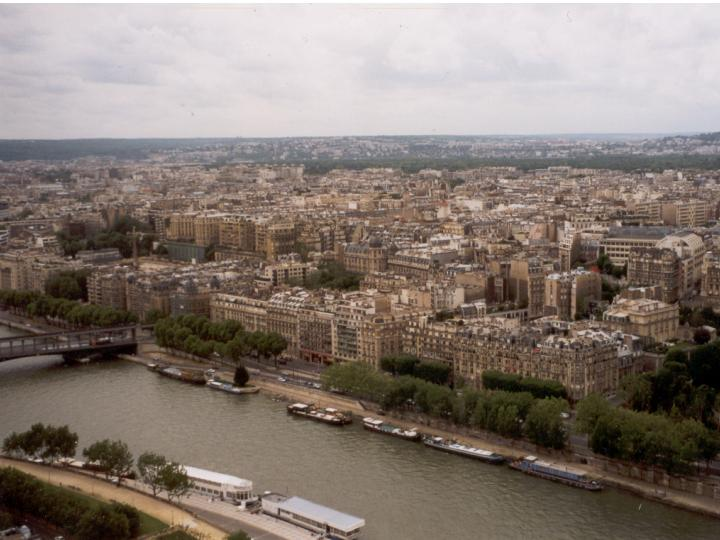
View of Passy as seen from the Eiffel Tower's second level

Passy (French pronunciation: [pasi]) is an area of Paris, France, located in the 16th arrondissement, on the Right Bank. It is adjacent to Auteuil to the southwest, and Chaillot to the northeast.

It is home to many of the city's wealthiest residents, hence its informal grouping in the Neuilly-Auteuil-Passy area. Many embassies are based in Passy.

== History ==
=== Early history ===
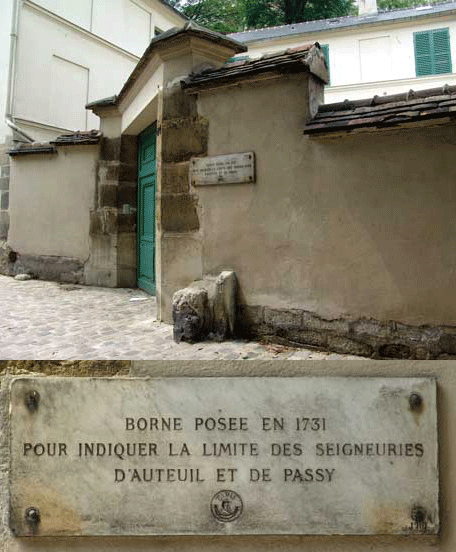
Landmark set between the domains of the Lord of Auteuil and the Lord of Passy in 1731

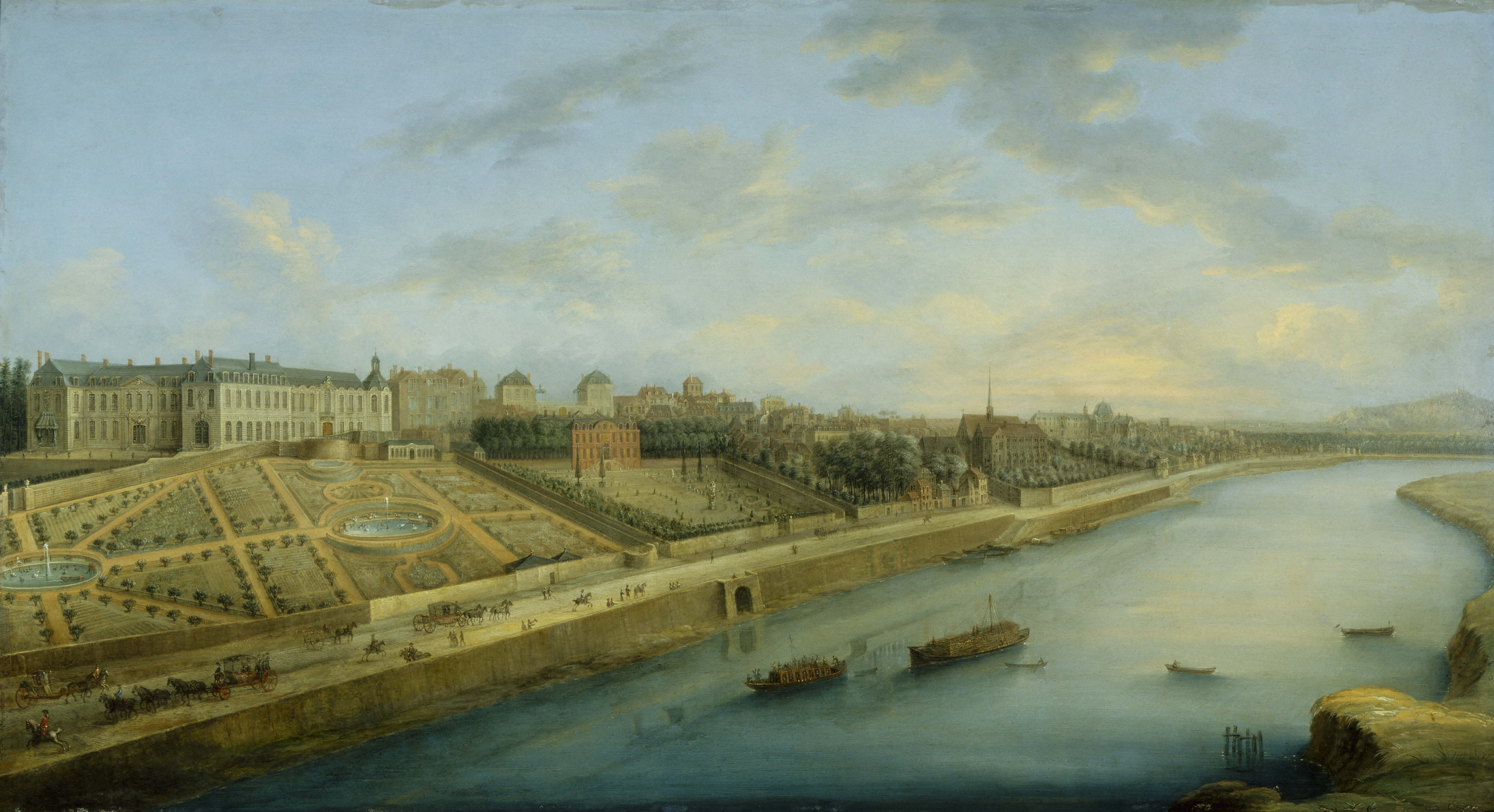
Passy and Chaillot as painted from Grenelle in the 1740s by Charles-Léopold Grevenbroeck

The earliest mention of Passy appears in a 1250 lease of villenage by members of the Congregation of France. The Château de Passy (no longer existing) was built in 1381, later renamed to Château de Boulainvilliers in 1747. During the 14th century, King Charles V of France authorized Passy's inhabitants to enclose their fields with walls, and a century later, in 1416, Passy became a Lordship. In 1658, hot mineral springs were discovered near what is now Rue des Eaux, where spa facilities were developed. This attracted Parisian society and English visitors, some of whom made the area, which combined attractive countryside with both modest houses and fine residences, their winter retreat, as it was located between Paris and the Chateau de Versailles. It was dependent on the parish of Auteuil until 1761. Anne Gabriel Henri Bernard de Boulainvilliers was the last lord of Passy, after he sold it to escape the guillotine.

=== Benjamin Franklin in Passy ===
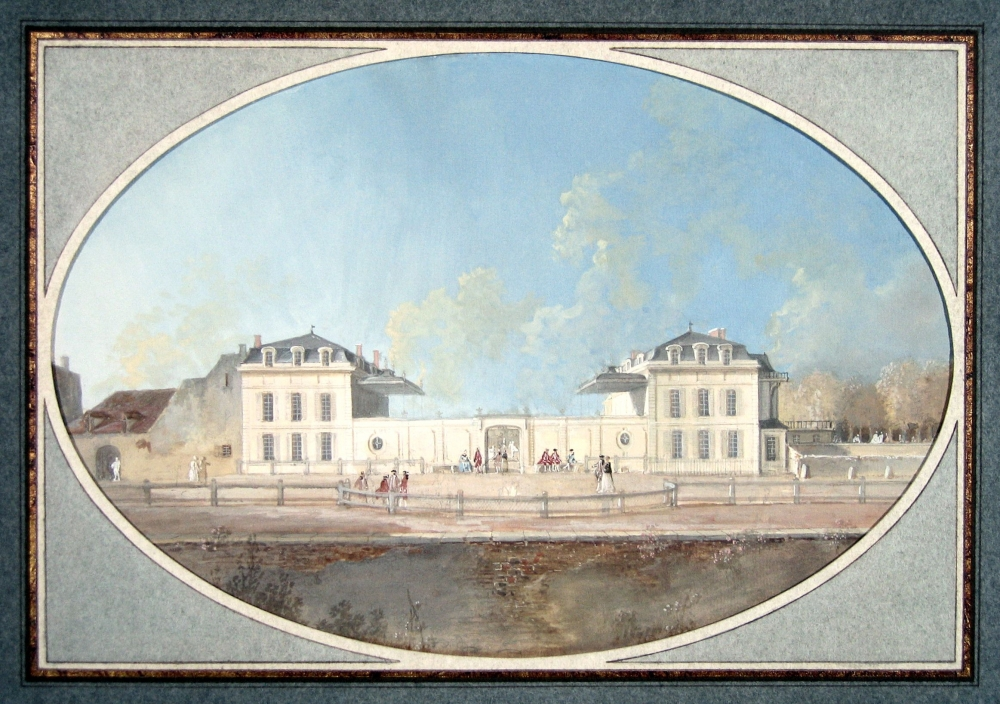
The Hôtel de Valentinois

The Hôtel de Valentinois (at that time the property of Monsieur de Chaumont) in Passy was the home of Benjamin Franklin during the nine years that he lived in France during the American Revolutionary War, when he represented American interests and sought French support for American independence.

Franklin established a small printing press in his lodgings to print pamphlets and other material as part of his mandate to maintain French support for the revolution. He called it the Passy Press. Among his printing projects, he produced comics he called Bagatelles and passports. He developed a typeface known as "le Franklin". He also printed a 1782 treatise by Pierre-André Gargaz titled A Project of Universal and Perpetual Peace, which laid out a vision for maintaining a permanent peace in Europe. It proposed a central governing council composed of representatives of all the nations of Europe to arbitrate international disputes.

He also worked on his scientific projects at a laboratory he shared with others, which had been installed by Louis XV in the Château de la Muette.

When Franklin returned to America, the new American Ambassador to France, Thomas Jefferson, wrote: "When he left Passy, it seemed as if the village had lost its patriarch." To this day, a street in Passy bears the name Rue Benjamin Franklin.

=== After the French Revolution ===
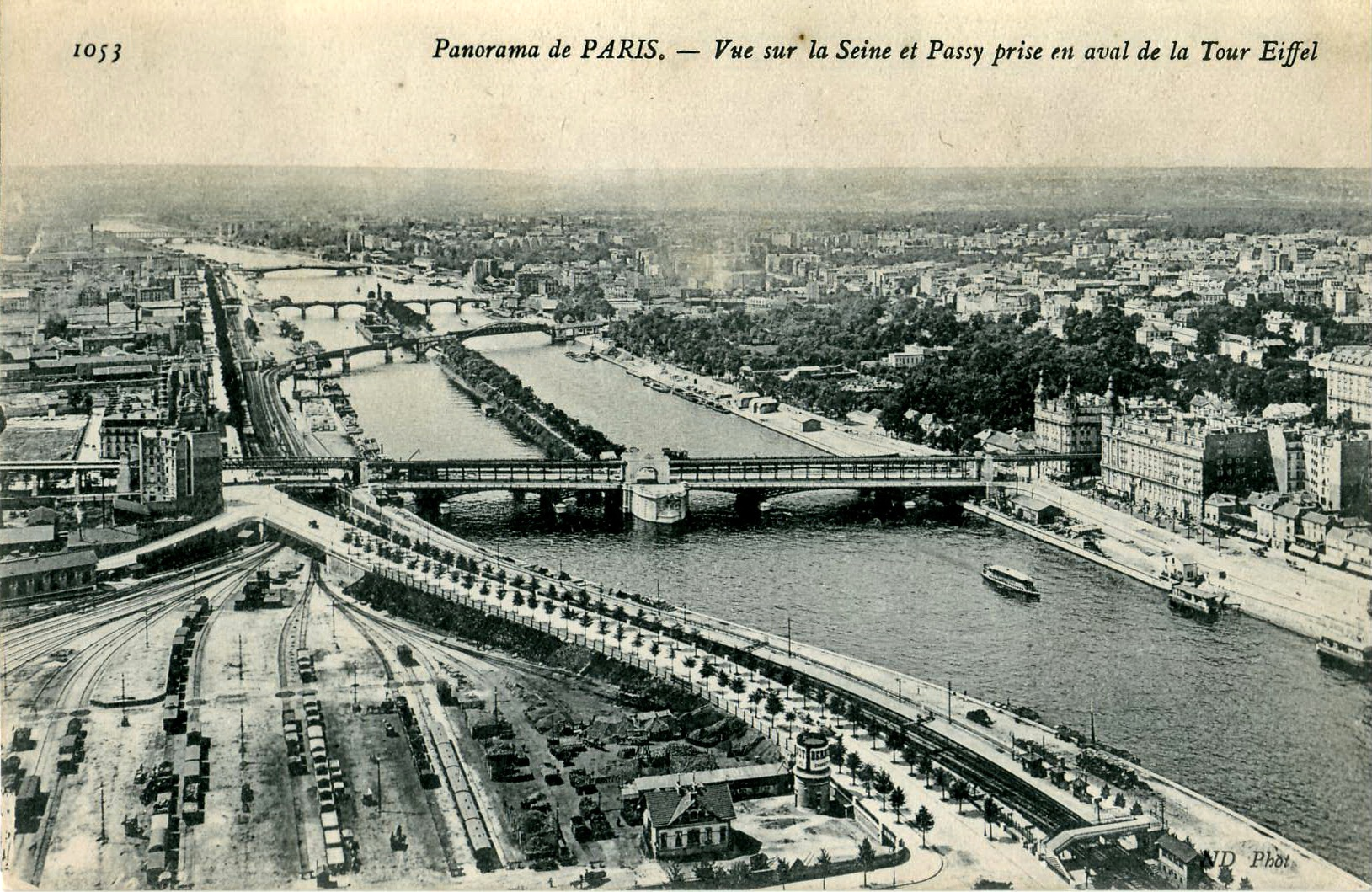
Early 20th-century downstream view (from the Eiffel Tower's second level) of the Seine with Pont de Passy (modern-day Pont Bir-Hakeim, foreground) connecting Grenelle (left) to Passy (right)

After the French Revolution, Passy became a commune of Seine. The population was 2,400 in 1836, 4,545 in 1841, but larger in summer. In 1861 the population was 11,431. Passy's population was 17,594 when it was absorbed into Paris along with several other communities in 1860.

==== Artists of Passy ====
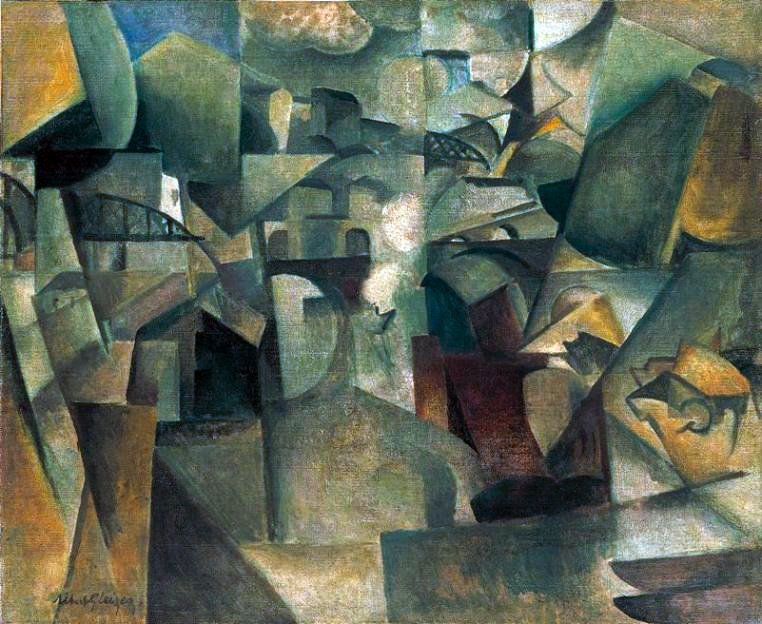
Albert Gleizes, 1912, Les ponts de Paris (Passy), The Bridges of Paris (Passy), oil on canvas, 60.5 cm × 73.2 cm (23.8 in × 28.8 in), Museum Moderner Kunst (mumok), Vienna. Published in Du "Cubisme", 1912

The painting Albert Gleizes painting Les ponts de Paris (Passy), The Bridges of Paris (Passy), housed in the collection of the Museum Moderner Kunst (mumok), Vienna, refers to the spirit of solidarity among the newly formed "Artists of Passy", during a time when factions had begun to develop within Cubism. Les Artistes de Passy consisted of a diverse grouping of avant-garde artistes (painters, sculptors and poets), including several who previously held meetings in 1910 at the rue Visconti studio of Henri Le Fauconnier. Their first diner presided over by neo-symbolist Paul Fort was held at the house of Balzac, rue Raynouard, in the presence of Guillaume Apollinaire, Raymond Duchamp-Villon, Marie Laurencin, Henri Le Fauconnier, Fernand Léger, André Mare, Jean Metzinger, Francis Picabia, Henry Valensi, and Jacques Villon. Albert Gleizes chose Passy as the subject of this painting.

== Landmarks ==
Passy is home to the Musée Marmottan Monet, housed in the Château de la Muette, and the Jardin du Ranelagh park. It is served by the Ranelagh metro station.

There is now a rue Benjamin Franklin and a square de Yorktown near the Trocadéro.

A lively street in the area is Rue de Passy, which goes from La Muette to the Place de Costa Rica just behind the Trocadéro. It has boutiques and chain stores along its length.

The Cimetière de Passy, located at 2, rue du Commandant Schœlsing, is the burial place for many well-known persons, including American silent film star Pearl White, the painters Édouard Manet and Berthe Morisot, and composer Claude Debussy.

Honoré de Balzac lived in Passy for over six years, and his house is now a museum (Maison de Balzac).

The apartment in which Marlon Brando trysts with Maria Schneider in Bernardo Bertolucci's 1972 film Last Tango in Paris was located in Passy.

Notre-Dame-de-Grace de Passy, the church where Brigitte Bardot married Roger Vadim in 1952.

== Notable people ==
- Pierre Baillot (1771–1842), French violinist and composer
- Honoré de Balzac (1799–1850), French novelist and playwright
- Jacques-Emile Blanche (1861–1942), French painter
- Jean François Boissonade de Fontarabie (Paris, 12 août 1774 - Passy, 8 septembre 1857), French historian
- Marc Bonnehée (1828–1886), French opera singer
- Pierre Bretonneau (1778–1862), French medical doctor
- Comtesse de Buyer-Mimeure, the former Miss Daisy Polk (fl. 1917), American activist
- Georges Clemenceau (1841–1929), French politician, physician, and journalist
- Eugène Demets (1858–1923), French music publisher
- Alfred Des Essarts (1811–1893), French playwright and poet
- Seymour Fleming (1758–1818), British noblewoman
- General Charles Edward Jennings de Kilmaine (1751–1799), Irish soldier and revolutionary
- Antoine-Henri Jomini (1779–1869), Swiss army officer
- Paul de Kock (1793–1871), French novelist
- Alphonse de Lamartine (1790–1869), French poet and politician
- Louis-Guillaume Le Veillard (1733–1794), aristocrat
- Princess Marie Louise of Savoy (1749–1792), Savoyan princess
- Berthe Morisot (1841–1895), French painter
- Virginia Oldoini, Countess di Castiglione (1837–1899), Italian aristocrat
- Niccolò Piccinni (1728–1800), Italian composer
- Camille Pissarro (1830–1903), French painter
- Alexandre Le Riche de La Poupelinière (1693–1762), French tax farmer and music patron
- Gioachino Rossini (1792–1868), Italian composer
- Léa Seydoux (1985), French actress
- William Kissam Vanderbilt (1849–1920), American businessman

== See also ==
- Théodore Année
- Madame Brillon
