= Le bestiaire (Poulenc) =

Song cycle by Francis Poulenc

- ou Cortège d'Orphée
- by Francis Poulenc
- Poulenc in 1922
- English: The Book of Beasts, or the Procession of Orpheus
- Catalogue: FP 15a
- Year: 1919
- Style: Modern
- Form: Song cycle
- Text: Guillaume Apollinaire's Le Bestiaire ou Cortège d'Orphée
- Language: French
- Dedication: Louis Durey
- Performed: 1919 - Paris
- Published: 1920 - Paris
- Publisher: La sirène musicale (Max Eschig)
- Duration: 5 minutes approx.
- Movements: 6
- Scoring: Original: Voice and instrumental ensemble Reduction: Voice and piano

Le bestiaire, ou Cortège d'Orphée (in English, The Book of Beasts, or the Procession of Orpheus), FP 15a, is a song cycle for voice and instrumental ensemble by French composer Francis Poulenc, after Guillaume Apollinaire's Le Bestiaire ou Cortège d'Orphée. Written in 1918 and 1919, it initially consisted of twelve songs, even though it was reduced to six before it was premiered and published.

== Background ==
The origin of Le bestiaire dates back to January 1919, when he was a soldier in L'Aube, in Pont-sur-Seine. It was at that time that Poulenc felt the need to write his first composition for voice. Adrienne Monnier, a bookseller and friend of Poulenc's, gave him a collection of books, among which was a 1918 reissued edition of Apollinaire's Le bestiaire with woodcuts by Raoul Dufy. Poulenc was struck by the book to a point he memorized a few passages and set a total of twelve poems on an old piano of a rural mansion in Pont-sur-Seine between the months of April and May 1919 (except for the last song, which was completed in February 1919). He intended his piece to be a tombeau in Apollinaire's memory, who had died in November of the previous year.

A preliminary performance of the original version, at which relevant poets at the time like André Breton, Blaise Cendrard, and Pierre Reverdy were present, included a total of twelve songs, premiered in this order: La tortue, La chèvre du Thibet, Le serpent, Le dromadaire, Le dauphin, La sauterelle, La mouche, L'écrevisse, La carpe, La puce, La colombe, and Le bœuf. On advice from fellow composer Georges Auric, the complete version of this composition only included six songs in rearranged order. According to the composer, the original version was scored for voice and instrumental ensemble, but he made an arrangement for voice and piano which also became popular and frequently performed.

The first private performance of Le bestiaire was given at the salons of Mme Vignon (in the avenue de Latour-Maubourg), in Paris, in the summer of 1919. Soprano Suzanne Peignot and the composer at the piano gave the private premiere. The first public performance, however, took place on June 8, 1919, at the gallery L'Éffort Moderne, in Paris, with Poulenc at the piano and singer Jeanne Borel. Both the original version and the reduction for voice and piano were published in 1920 by La sirène musicale, which was later bought by Max Eschig. Poulenc later stated he was unhappy with La sirène musicale for losing an entire accurate copy of the original version and not printing it. Because both version were published virtually simultaneously, but the original version failed to have the same amount of circulation, some musicologists have wrongly classified the version for voice and instrumental ensemble as the arrangement.

Right before the set was published, Poulenc learned that Louis Durey, another member of Les Six with whom Poulenc had barely any connection, also set Le bestiaire, but set every poem from the original collection by Apollinaire. The six settings Poulenc wrote were dedicated to Durey. None of the original autographs have been preserved, except for the last song in the cycle, La carpe, of which there are two copies made by the composer. Another copy of an unnamed song in Le bestiaire was sent to Georges Jean-Aubry along with a letter dated June 10, 1919. Even though the letter was preserved and is now located in New York, the manuscript is currently lost. Additionally, two of the unpublished songs for voice and piano, La serpent and La colombe, resurfaced in 1944 as miniatures copied out for a friend. They were categorized as Deux mélodies inédites du bestiaire, FP 15b. La puce was reworked into a standalone piece on November 9, 1960, as a homage for Raoul Dufy, who had died a few years prior. It was posthumously published in 1965, in Marcelle Oury's anthology in tribute to Dufy's memory, Lettres à mon peintre. The three remaining original unpublished songs, Le bœuf, La mouche, and La tortue, are now lost.

== Structure ==
The complete song cycle consists of six songs based on poems from the original collection by Apollinaire. It has a total duration of around five minutes. Even though these songs are very brief, Poulenc intended the pieces to be read and performed seriously, with an intent comparable to the German lied. The original version of the cycle is scored for voice (unspecified) and an instrumental ensemble consisting of a string quartet (two violins, viola, and cello), flute, clarinet in B♭, and bassoon. Along with this version, Poulenc also wrote and published a reduction for voice and piano. Even though the lyrics were not translated for the original version, the reduction included translations for the lyrics into English, by Percy Pinkerton, and German, by Leo Melitz. None of the six pieces have a key signature. The movement list is as follows:

1. Le dromadaire (The Dromedary). Très rythmé, pesant - Allegro
2. La chèvre du Thibet (The Goat from Tibet). Très modéré
3. La sauterelle (The Grasshopper). Lent
4. Le dauphin (The Dolphin). Animé
5. L'écrevisse (The Crab). Assez vif
6. La carpe (The Carp). Très triste, très lent

The first piece, Le dromadaire, is a 43-bar, 2/4 piece with no key signature, even though the tonal center is around E minor. The accompaniment, which uses scales in quintuplets, evokes the dromedaries galumphing through the sand. It includes an interludic, variation-like section and a small postlude in E major.

The second piece, La chèvre du Thibet, gravitates around G minor. It is in 4/4 and has only 8 bars. Baritone Pierre Bernac insisted on smiling at the end of the piece, as it was purported to be a love song in disguise. The piano interlude in bars 4 and 5 uses goat-like acciaccaturas in both hands.

The third piece, La sauterelle, is the shortest song in the cycle. In 4/4 and only measuring 4 bars, it is a modal piece. Even though it is marked Lent in the score, the constantly changing tonal center and the oscillating tones on the part of the voice and the piano resemble the parodical meaning of the text.

The fourth piece, Le dauphin, revolves around the key of A major. It is in 4/4 and has 13 bars. It is a rather quickly-paced piece, even though Pierre Bernac insisted for it to be played slightly more slowly. It paints a playful dolphin by alternating dynamics every two bars, forte and piano.

The fifth piece, L'écrevisse, gravitates towards A-flat minor. It is in 4/4 and has 12 bars. Bernac, again, corrected the tempo and set it a bit slower. Arguably, the most noticeable aspect of this song is the use of the downward portato in the voice, implying the shellfish is going backwards.

The sixth and last piece, La carpe, is an 11-bar, 4/4 piece the tonal center of which is A-flar minor. The accompanying piano presents an ostinato at the beginning of the song which is used all throughout, while the voice sings a slow-moving melody, resembling the large fish moving in the depths of a pond.

== Reception ==
The cycle quickly became famous among modern singers. Marie Laurencin, Apollinaire's former mistress, praised Poulenc's setting of Le bestiaire in a letter from September 1921 as follows: "You have no idea, Francis Poulenc, how well you have conveyed both the nostalgia and the singsong quality of those admirable quatrains". British pianist Graham Johnson has described Poulenc's setting as having an "almost unnervingly simple style" which works well with the poet's tender seriousness: "The composer is amusing, chic, naughty, and self-consciously modern; he may be an artistic snob, but he is clearly already a young man able to conjure real magic from the most slender of musical means." Poulenc stated that Claire Croiza, Marya Freund, and Pierre Bernac were the most distinguished interpreters of the cycle.

== Recordings ==
Poulenc's version for voice and piano became the most performed and recorded of all, even immediately after its publication. Pierre Bernac, a baritone with a style Poulenc was particularly fond of, recorded the entire cycle with the composer at the piano on November 12, 1945, at Abbey Road Studio 3, in London.
