= Les mamelles de Tirésias =

Surrealist opéra bouffe by Francis Poulenc

- opéra bouffe by Francis Poulenc
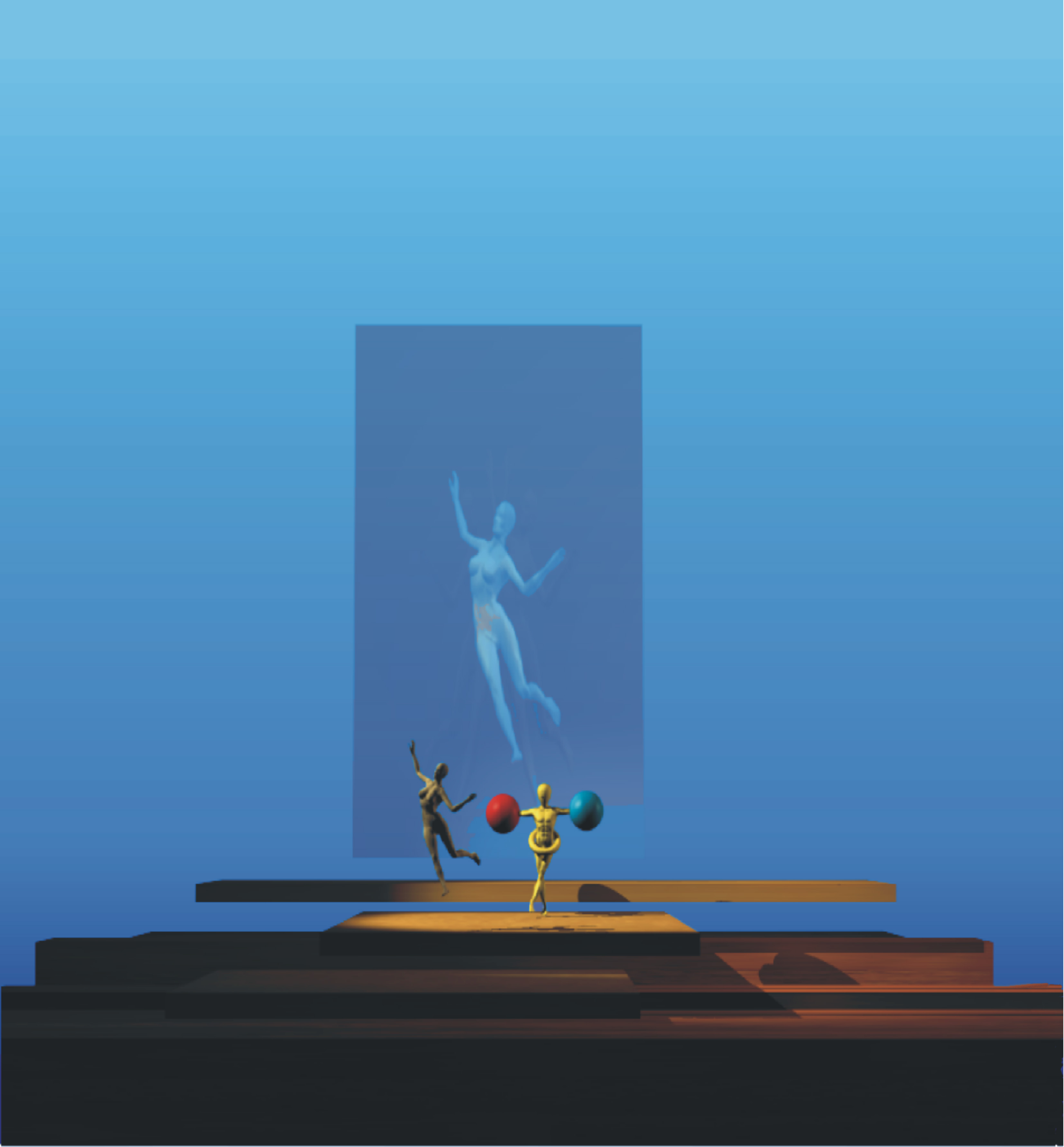
- Design for the opera, 2001
- Translation: The Breasts of Tiresias
- Librettist: Poulenc
- Language: French
- Based on: The Breasts of Tiresias by Guillaume Apollinaire
- Premiere: 3 June 1947; Opéra-Comique, Paris

Les mamelles de Tirésias (The Breasts of Tiresias) is an opéra bouffe by Francis Poulenc, in a prologue and two acts based on the eponymous play by Guillaume Apollinaire. The opera was written in 1945 and first performed in 1947. Apollinaire's play, written in 1903, was revised with a sombre prologue by the time it premiered during World War I in France. For the opera, Poulenc incorporated both the farcical and the serious aspects of the original play, which according to one critic displays a "high-spirited topsy-turveydom" that conceals "a deeper and sadder theme – the need to repopulate and rediscover a France ravaged by war."

== Background ==
Guillaume Apollinaire was one of a group of poets whom Poulenc had met as a teenager. Adrienne Monnier's bookshop, the Maison des Amis des Livres, was a meeting place for avant-garde writers including Apollinaire, Max Jacob, Paul Éluard and Louis Aragon. Apollinaire, the illegitimate son of a Polish noblewoman, was described by the critic Edward Lockspeiser as the prominent leader of Bohemian life in Montparnasse. Among his achievements were to bring to prominence the painter the Douanier Rousseau, and to invent the term "surrealism", of which he was a leading exponent. In June 1917 the audience for the first performance of Apollinaire's "drame surréaliste", Les mamelles de Tirésias, at a theatre in Montmartre included Jean Cocteau, Serge Diaghilev, Léonide Massine, Henri Matisse, Pablo Picasso, Erik Satie, and the young Poulenc. Many years later Poulenc said that though he had been immensely amused by the farcical piece it did not occur to him at the time that he would ever set it to music.

Poulenc first set Apollinaire's words to music in his 1919 song cycle La Bestiaire, and returned to the poet's work for the choral work Sept chansons (1936). During the 1930s he first thought of setting Les mamelles de Tirésias as an opera; in 1935 he adapted the script as a libretto, with the blessing of Apollinaire's widow, and began sketching the music in 1939, with most of the composition done in a burst of creativity between May and October 1944. Although the play was written in 1903, by the time of its premiere France was in the thick of the First World War, and Apollinaire had revised the piece, adding a sombre prologue. Poulenc aimed to reflect both the farcical and the serious aspects of the play. The critic Jeremy Sams describes the opera as "high-spirited topsy-turveydom" concealing "a deeper and sadder theme – the need to repopulate and rediscover a France ravaged by war."

With Mme Apollinaire's approval, Poulenc changed the date and setting from those of the original. "I chose 1912 because that was Apollinaire's heroic period, of the first fights for Cubism ... I substituted Monte-Carlo for Zanzibar to avoid the exotic, and because Monte-Carlo, which I adore, and where Apollinaire spent the first 15 years of his life, is quite tropical enough for the Parisian that I am."

Kaminski writes that the music, while in the line of Offenbach, Chabrier and Ravel's L'heure espagnole, impresses the listener with its stream of "miniatures and vignettes", dances (a valse for Thérèse, a polka for Lacouf and Presto) and pastiches from other lyric music such as ariettes in the style of opéra comique or chorales (after the duel).

== Performance history ==
The opera premiered at the Opéra-Comique in Paris on 3 June 1947 with costumes and décor by Erté. Poulenc recalled, "The ravishing sets Erté designed for the Opera-Comique with, in the Finale, those lamps in the style of a 1914 restaurant car, were exactly what I was after. As for the ladies' clothes, they were exact copies of the dresses (what at the time were called 'toilettes') that Erté had designed for Poiret's 1912 collection."

The opera was revived in Paris in 1972, followed by Lille in 1985 and Saint-Étienne in 1989. Outside France it was seen in Massachusetts in 1953, Basel in 1957, and at Aldeburgh in 1958 in an arrangement by the composer for two pianos (played by Poulenc and Benjamin Britten; Peter Pears sang the role of Thérèse's husband, transposed to suit his range.). Further local premieres took place in Philadelphia in 1959, Milan in 1963, New York in 1974, London in 1979, Düsseldorf in 1982, Tokyo in 1985, and at the Barcelona Liceu in its 2009–2010 season. Sheri Greenawald portrayed Thérèse in the New York première of the opera which was staged by the Manhattan Theater Club in 1974.

== Roles ==
Role	Voice type	Premiere cast, 3 June 1947 (Conductor: Albert Wolff)
Theatre director	baritone	Robert Jeantet
Thérèse/Tirésias	soprano	Denise Duval
Her husband	baritone sometimes sung by tenor	Paul Payen
Monsieur Lacouf	tenor	Alban Derroja
Monsieur Presto	baritone	Marcel Enot
A gendarme	baritone	Émile Rousseau
A newspaper vendor	mezzo-soprano	Jane Atty
A reporter from Paris	tenor	Serge Rallier
The son	tenor	Jacques Hivert
An elegant lady	soprano	Irène Gromova
A woman	mezzo-soprano	Yvonne Girard-Ducy
A bearded gentleman	bass	Gabriel Jullia
Chorus of People of Zanzibar

== Synopsis ==
In a short prologue, the theatre director introduces the work, promising the audience a moral piece on the necessity of having children.

=== Act 1 ===
Thérèse tires of her life as a submissive woman and becomes the male Tirésias when her breasts turn into balloons and float away. Her husband is not pleased by this, still less so when she ties him up and dresses him as a woman.

Meanwhile, a pair of drunken gamblers called Presto and Lacouf affectionately shoot one another and are mourned by the assembled townspeople. Thérèse marches off to conquer the world as General Tiresias, leaving her captive husband to the attentions of the local gendarme, who is fooled by his female attire.

Off-stage, General Tiresias starts a successful campaign against childbirth and is hailed by the populace. Fearful that France will be left sterile if women give up sex, the husband vows to find a way to bear children without women. Lacouf and Presto return from the dead and express both interest and scepticism.

=== Act 2 ===
The curtain rises to cries of "Papa!" The husband's project has been a spectacular success, and he has given birth to 40,049 children in a single day. A visiting Parisian journalist asks how he can afford to feed the brood, but the husband explains that the children have all been very successful in careers in the arts, and have made him a rich man with their earnings. After chasing the journalist off, the husband decides to raise a journalist of his own, but is not completely pleased with the results.

The gendarme now arrives to report that, because of overpopulation, the citizens of Zanzibar are all dying of hunger. The husband suggests getting ration cards printed by a tarot-reading fortune-teller. Just such a fortune-teller immediately appears, looking rather familiar under his mask.

The fortune-teller prophesies that the fertile husband will be a multi-millionaire, but that the sterile gendarme will die in abject poverty. Incensed, the gendarme attempts to arrest him, but he strangles him and reveals himself as none other than Tirésias. The couple reconcile, and the whole cast gathers at the footlights to urge the audience:

Ecoutez, ô Français, les leçons de la guerre Et faites des enfants, vous qui n'en faisiez guère Cher public: faites des enfants!	Heed, o Frenchmen, the lessons of the war And make babies, you who hardly ever make them! Dear audience: Make babies!

== Recordings ==
- André Cluytens conducting the Chorus and Orchestra of the Théatre National de l'Opéra-Comique de Paris, with Denise Duval, Marguerite Legouhy, and Jean Giraudeau (1954, Angel Records)
- Seiji Ozawa conducting the Saito Kinen Orchestra with Barbara Bonney, Jean-Paul Fouchécourt, and Wolfgang Holzmair (1998, Philips)
- Ed Spanjaard conducting the Nieuw Ensemble with Renate Arends, Bernard Loonen, Mattijs Van de Woerd and Opera Trionfo, version for 16 instruments by Bart Visman (2003, Brilliant Classics)
- Ludovic Morlot conducting the Orchestre National de Lyon with Hélène Guilmette, Ivan Ludlow, Werner van Mechelen, and Jeannette Fischer (2010, https://www.forumopera.com/spectacle/quel-cirque/)
