= Jacques Hivert =

French opera singer

Jacques Hivert (1919–1987) was a French 20th-century martin baritone.

== Biography ==
Enlisted in 1942 in the Opéra-Comique troupe, Hivert was awarded a second prize in the Conservatoire de Paris for his singing. He quickly became indispensable thanks to savoury compositions that his talent as an actor enriched in a very personal way.

Countless Sacristians of Tosca (with Régine Crespin and Albert Lance), to Goro in Madame Butterfly, Puccini's La Bohème, where he alternately plays Marcel, Benoit, (side by side with Martha Angelici) were offered to him to interpret each evening, during an abundant secondary career within the Réunion des théâtres lyriques nationaux, until the early sixties.

Francis Poulenc, appreciating him, acknowledged him a "chic and admirable diction" - "Happy father who has such a gifted child", will write the great French composer about him.

In 1947, Jacques Hivert recorded and created in the Salle Favart, the role of the son in Poulenc's Les mamelles de Tirésias alongside Denise Duval, a partner he will often work again with, particularly in Jacques Ibert's Angélique, Manuel Rosenthal's La Poule Noire and in Henri Büsser's Le Carrosse du Saint-Sacrement.

In 1948, he flew to Buenos Aires, replacing his singing teacher Roger Bourdin, to perform Charlot, in Angelique (opera), in front of Evita Perón.

Skillfully disguised and unrecognizable, he will embody highly convincing characters of all ages. Darius Milhaud's Le pauvre matelot, André Messager's Monsieur Beaucaire, Guillot de Morfontaine in Puccini's Manon, will remain among his remarkable compositions.

Married to the French contralto Denise Scharley of the Paris Opéra, he opened the doors of the Carmel of Compiègne to her where, for the first time in 1971, the Carmelites agreed to participate behind the grids in the concert he organised with his friend tenor Louis Rialland, of the Dialogues des Carmélites, even singing religious songs of Francis Poulenc's opera. On the strength of this experience and supported by Georges Auric and Henri Sauguet, the survivors of "Les Six" chaired by Darius Milhaud, who wished to save the work, he will direct his wife on the provincial stages in this work where she remains unequalled as Première Prieur. While the latter embodies this leading role on the stage of the Paris Opéra in 1972 in a fanciful and contested staging by Raymond Rouleau, Jacques Hivert alone, faithful to the composer's wishes, won unanimous approval from critics.

He will once again stage Denise Scharley in one of her leading roles, Madame Flora in Gian-Carlo Menotti's The Medium.

Jacques Hivert died in 1987, after having taught singing, the last role that was close to his heart.
