= The Breasts of Tiresias =

1917 surrealist drama

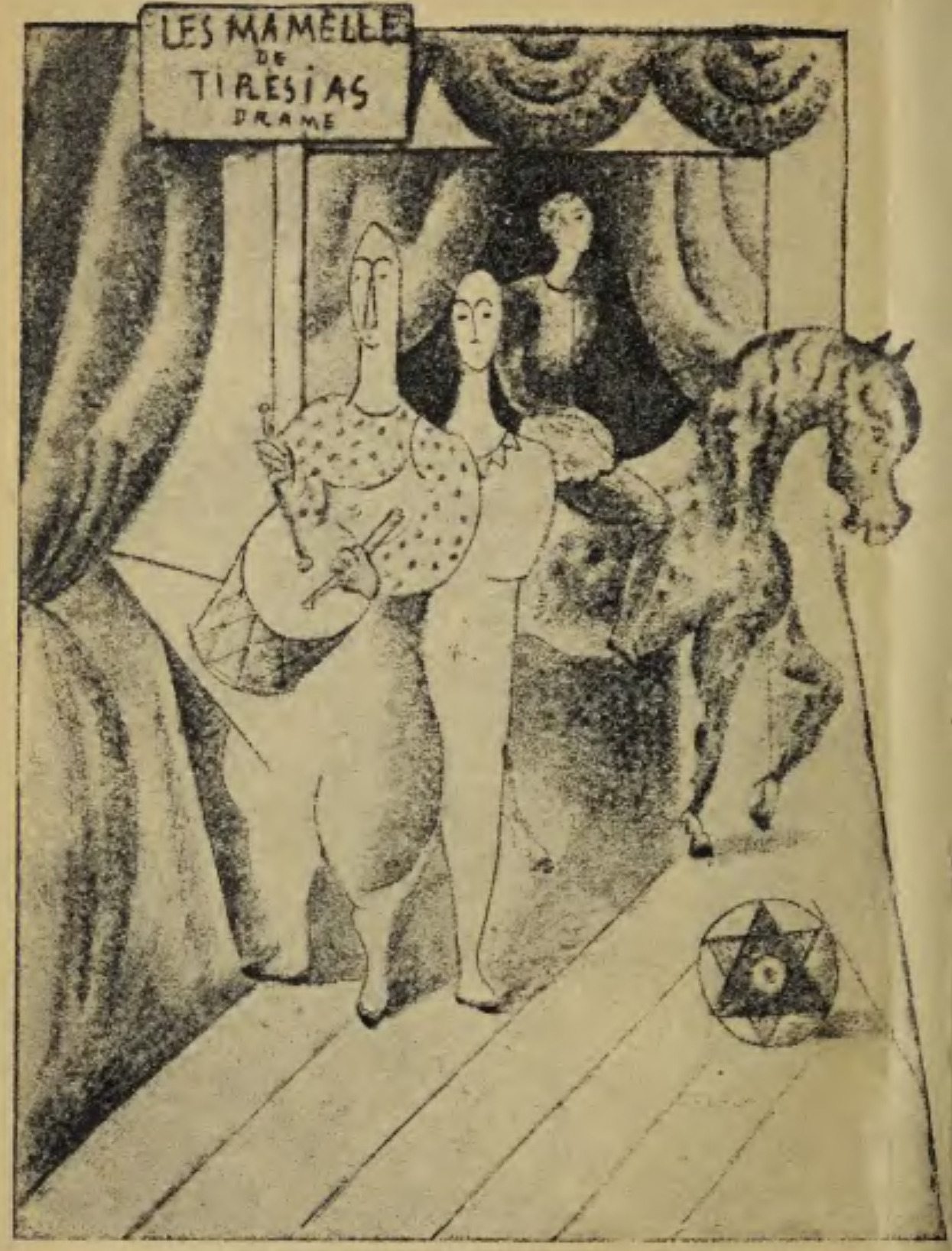
- Frontispiece for the playtext of Les Mamelles de Tirésias. Editions SIC, 1918.
- Original language: French
- Written by: Guillaume Apollinaire
- Genre: Surrealist drama

Premiere
- Date: 24 June 1917
- Place: Conservatoire Maubel, rue de l'Armée-d'Orient, Paris 18.

The Breasts of Tiresias (French: Les Mamelles de Tirésias) is a surrealist play in two acts and a prologue by Guillaume Apollinaire, premiered at the conservatoire Maubel (now the Théâtre Montmartre-Galabru) on 24 June 1917. The production was by Pierre Albert-Birot, sets by Serge Férat and costumes by Irène Lagut. The music for piano was by Germaine Albert-Birot.

Apollinaire subtitled his work drame surréaliste With this subtitle and in the preface to the play, the poet invented the word "surrealism" to describe his new style of drama.

The play has been adapted into an opera by Francis Poulenc. It also has been translated twice, first by Louis Simpson in the 1960s and then by Maya Slater in 2009. In 2010, Eric Wallach adapted and directed The Breasts of Tiresias: A Surrealist Musical in Paris.

== The myth of Tiresias ==
There are several alternate accounts of how Tiresias lost his sight and became a clairvoyant. The one relevant to Apollinaire's play is the version recounted by Ovid in Book III of his Metamorphoses, which involves Tiresias changing gender.

Tiresias was walking in the forest and came across two serpents mating. He strikes them with his staff, and is transformed into a woman. After eight years living as a woman, he sees the same serpents, again mating, and says to himself, "If the blow you have received is so powerful that it can completely alter the fate of the one who dealt it, I shall strike you once more." He strikes them again, and is transformed back into a man.

The gods Jupiter and Juno were arguing over who gets the greatest pleasure from sex, and Jupiter decides to ask Tiresias for a judgement, as the only person who has lived both genders. Tiresias declares that women get the majority of the pleasure. Juno, outraged, blinds Tiresias. Jupiter, unable to cancel the acts of another god, gives Tiresias the ability to read the future in compensation.

== Genesis of the play ==
In December 1916, the poet Pierre Albert-Birot asked Apollinaire to write a play. Apollinaire agreed, saying that he had a play started well before the war, in 1903, and almost completed. In fact, what he had was just a few notes on a burlesque idea: a woman decides to change her gender, and her breasts—represented by balloons—fly away from her bodice. Apollinaire set to work, writing and rewriting his play as he gave readings at the homes of designer Serge Férat and Albert-Birot. He made profound changes to his text during rehearsals, depending on the effect they produced, as Albert-Birot attests:

"Apollinaire understood ever more clearly that theatre is poetry that one sees"

== Plot ==
Inspired by the story of the Theban soothsayer Tiresias, the author inverted the myth to produce a provocative interpretation with feminist and pacifist elements. He tells the story of Thérèse, who changes her sex to obtain power among men, with the aim of changing customs, subverting the past, and establishing equality between the sexes.

=== Prologue ===
Written in free verse, the character of the Theatre Director addresses the audience directly. He laments the destruction wrought by war, accusing the enemies of 'extinguishing the stars' and 'murdering the constellations'. Then, in a defence of modern art, he sets out a new conception of theatre—envisioning, for example, a reorganisation of the stage space—and proclaims:

"Here we are attempting to breathe new life into the theatre."

=== Act I ===
The play takes us to Zanzibar, a country lacking in children, an allegory for France at war. The heroine, Thérèse, after a series of feminist proclamations, makes it known that she refuses her duty to procreate, and chooses a man’s name for herself: Tirésias. Her feminine attributes—two balloons—detach from her bodice and float away into the air, whilst a beard begins to grow on her face. Tirésias then forces her husband to dress in women’s clothing and leaves it to him to procreate in turn. He gives birth to 40,050 babies in a single day.

=== Act II ===
Thérèse reconsiders her decision and promises to give birth to twice as many children as her husband.

== Sources ==
- Banham, Martin, ed. 1998. The Cambridge Guide to Theatre. Cambridge: Cambridge UP. ISBN 0-521-43437-8.
- Brockett, Oscar G. and Franklin J. Hildy. 2003. History of the Theatre. Ninth edition, International edition. Boston: Allyn and Bacon. ISBN 0-205-41050-2.
- Lentengre, Marie-Louise (1993). Pierre Albert-Birot, l'Invention de soi (in French). Jean-Michel Place. ISBN 2-85893-160-7.
