= Le Bestiaire ou Cortège d'Orphée =

Poetry collection

Le Bestiaire ou Cortège d'Orphée (English title: "The Bestiary or Procession of Orpheus") is a poetic album of 30 short poems by Guillaume Apollinaire with woodcuts by Raoul Dufy, published in 1911.

== The Poems ==
Guillaume Apollinaire, was a bibliophile and a specialist in medieval bestiaries. In 1906, Picasso, a friend of Apollinaire's, had made some experimental woodcuts of animals. Apollinaire published eighteen poems figuring all kinds of semi-mythical animals in 1908 in La phalange, an experimental journal and promised his readers an illustrated edition. Picasso was not willing to cooperate and the poet persuaded Raoul Dufy, an engraver, to provide the woodcuts. Orpheus is present in four of the 30 poems.

== Music ==
Several composers were inspired by these poems to set them to music: Francis Poulenc's Le bestiaire (1919), Louis Durey (1919), Jean Absil (1944) and others. Francis Poulenc originally selected twelve poems, but only published six. His friend Louis Durey composed a complete cycle (26 short songs; he omitted the poems about Orpheus). Both wrote for baritone solo accompanied by piano.

Northern Irish composer Alan Mills set six of the poems to music (for baritone and piano) in 1985.

== Bibliography ==
- Guillaume Apollinaire, Le Bestiaire ou Cortège d'Orphée, illustrations by Raoul Dufy, Deplanche, 1911 - La Sirène, 1919.
- Guillaume Apollinaire, Le Bestiaire ou Cortège d'Orphée, colour lithographs by Jean Picart Le Doux, Les Bibliophiles de France, 1962.
