= Guillaume Apollinaire =

French poet and writer (1880–1918)

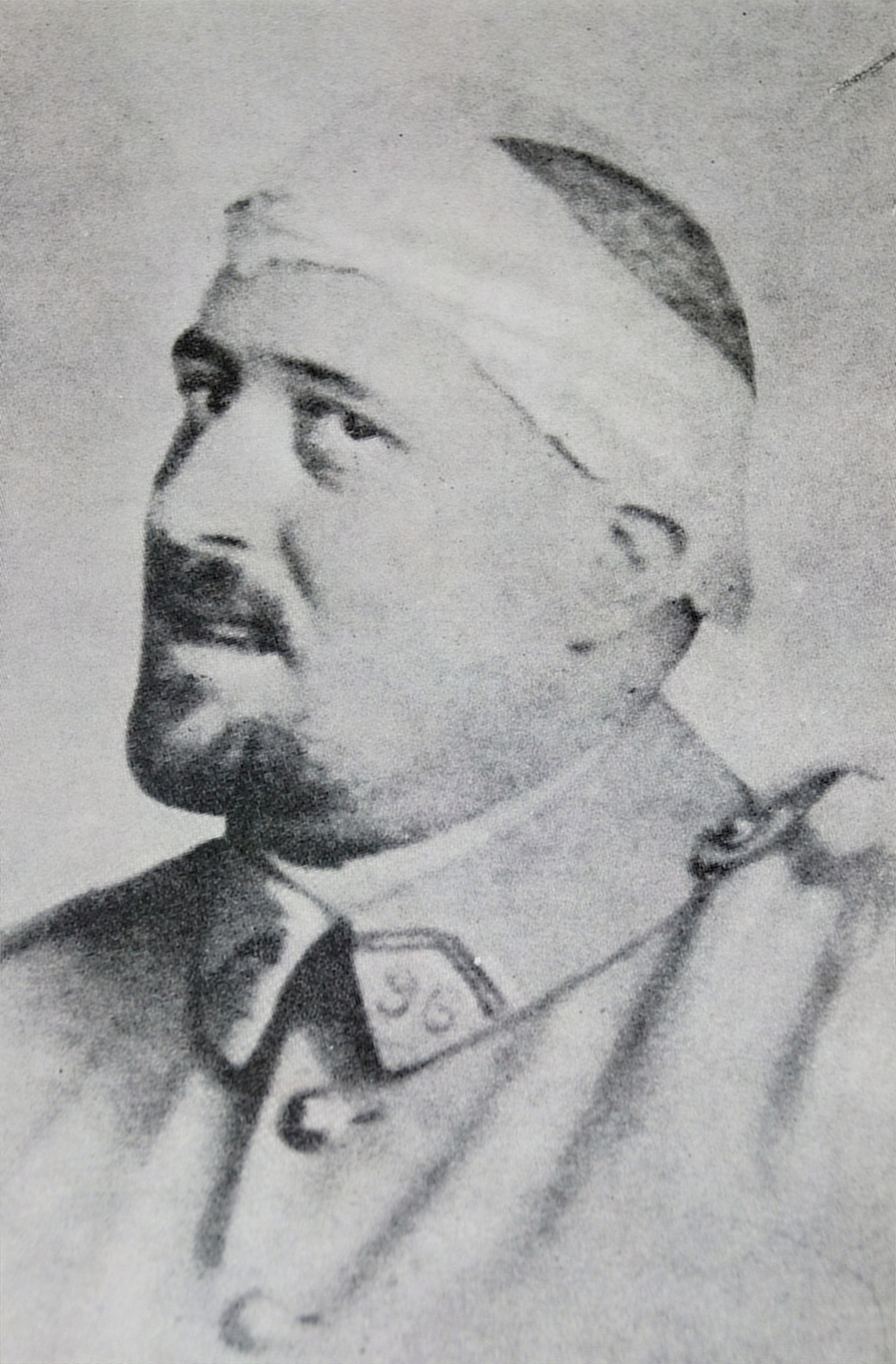
- Photograph of Apollinaire from spring 1916, after a shrapnel wound to his temple
- Born: Wilhelm Albert Włodzimierz Apolinary Kostrowicki; 26 August 1880; Rome, Kingdom of Italy
- Died: 9 November 1918 (aged 38); Paris, France
- Resting place: Père Lachaise Cemetery, Paris
- Occupations: Poet; writer; art critic
- Writing career
- Movements: Cubism; Surrealism; Orphism

Kostrowicki family's coat-of-arms

Guillaume Apollinaire (/əˌpɒlɪˈnɛər/ ə-POL-in-AIR, French: [ɡijom apɔlinɛːʁ]; born Wilhelm Albert Włodzimierz Aleksander Apolinary Kostrowicki; (Note: Polish pronunciation: [ˈvilxɛlm ˈalbɛrd vwɔˈd͡ʑimjɛʂ alɛkˈsandɛr apɔliˈnarɨ kɔstrɔˈvit͡skʲi]; Belarusian: Гіём Альберт Уладзімір Аляксандр Апалінарый Кастравіцкі, romanized: Giyom Alʹbyert Uladzimir Alyaksandr Apalinaryi Kastravitski; names of the Wąż coat of arms.) 26 August 1880 – 9 November 1918) was a Polish-French poet, playwright, short story writer, novelist and art critic of Polish, Swiss and Italian descent.

Apollinaire is considered one of the foremost poets of the early 20th century, as well as one of the most impassioned defenders of Cubism and a forefather of Surrealism. He is credited with coining the term "Cubism" in 1911 to describe the emerging art movement, the term Orphism in 1912, and the term "Surrealism" in 1917 to describe the works of Erik Satie. He wrote poems without punctuation, in his attempt to be resolutely modern in both form and subject. Apollinaire wrote one of the earliest Surrealist literary works, the play The Breasts of Tiresias (1917), which became the basis for Francis Poulenc's 1947 opera Les mamelles de Tirésias.

Influenced by Symbolist poetry in his youth, he was admired during his lifetime by the young poets who later formed the nucleus of the Surrealist group (Breton, Aragon, Soupault). He revealed very early on an originality that freed him from any school of influence and made him one of the precursors of the literary revolution of the first half of the 20th century. His art is not based on any theory, but on a simple principle: the act of creating must come from the imagination, from intuition, because it must be as close as possible to life, to nature, to the environment, and to the human being.

Apollinaire was also active as a journalist and art critic for Le Matin, L'Intransigeant, L'Esprit nouveau, Mercure de France, and Paris Journal. In 1912 Apollinaire cofounded Les Soirées de Paris, an artistic and literary magazine.

Two years after being wounded in World War I, Apollinaire died during the Spanish flu pandemic of 1918 and was recognized as "Fallen for France" (Mort pour la France) because of his commitment during the war.

== Life ==
=== Family and early life ===
Apollinaire (left) and André Rouveyre in 1914

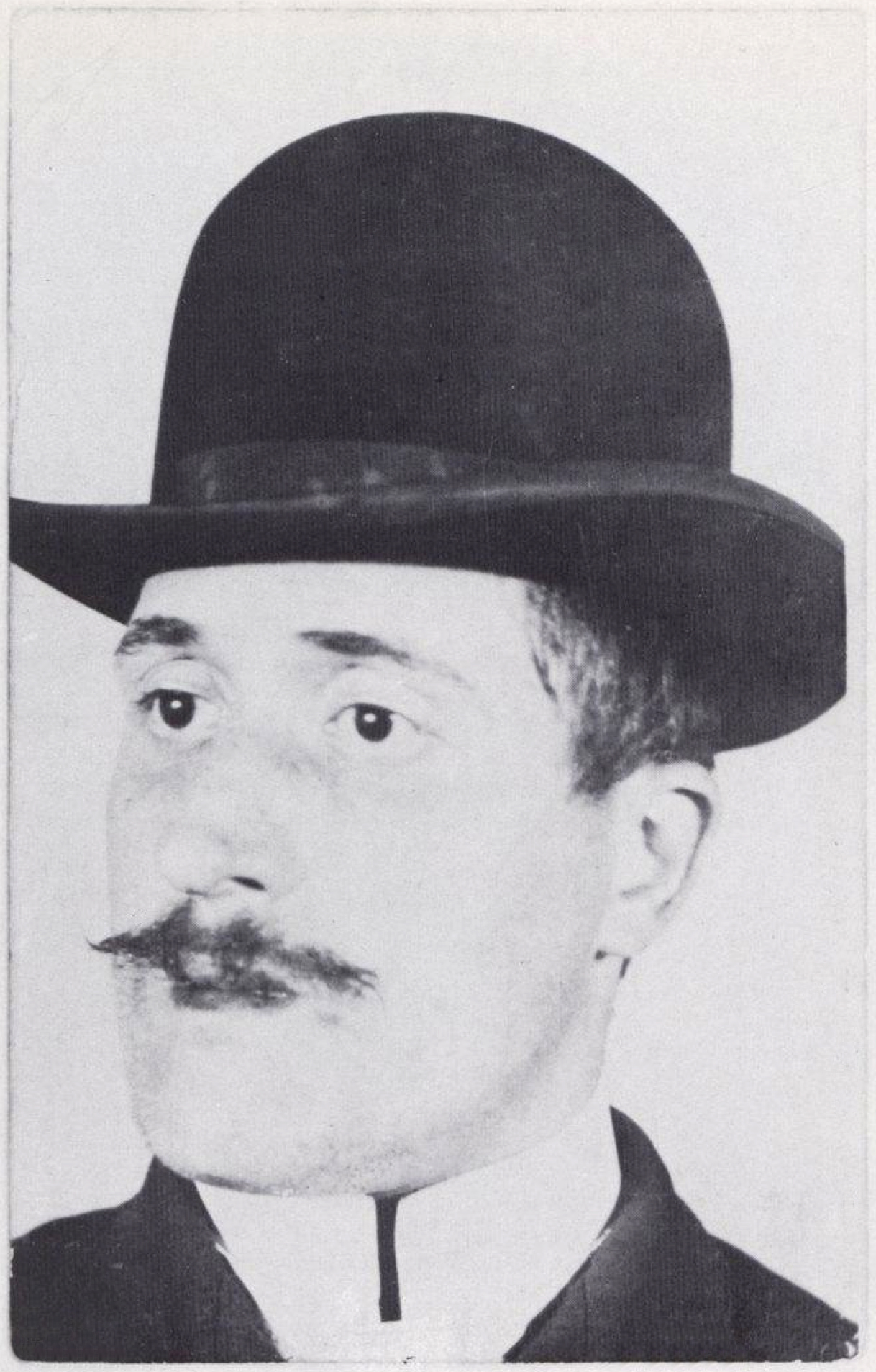
Apollinaire, 1902, Cologne

Wilhelm Albert Włodzimierz Apolinary Kostrowicki was born in Rome, Italy, and was raised speaking French, Italian, and Polish. He emigrated to France in his late teens and adopted the name Guillaume Apollinaire. His mother, born Angelika Kostrowicka, was a Polish-Lithuanian noblewoman born near Navahrudak (Nowogródek in Polish), Grodno Governorate (former Grand Duchy of Lithuania, present-day Belarus). His maternal grandfather participated in the 1863 uprising against occupying Russia and had to emigrate when the uprising failed. Apollinaire's father is unknown but may have been Francesco Costantino Camillo Flugi d'Aspermont (born 1835), a Graubünden aristocrat who disappeared early from Apollinaire's life. Francesco Flugi d'Aspermont was a nephew of Conradin Flugi d'Aspermont (1787–1874), a poet who wrote in Romansh Putèr (an official language dialect of Switzerland spoken in Upper Engadin), and perhaps also descendant of the Minnesänger Oswald von Wolkenstein (born c. 1377, died 2 August 1445; see Les ancêtres Grisons du poète Guillaume Apollinaire at Geneanet).

=== Paris ===
Apollinaire eventually moved from Rome to Paris in 1900 and became one of the most popular members of the artistic communities of Paris (both in Montmartre and Montparnasse). His friends and collaborators in that period included Pablo Picasso, Henri Rousseau, Gertrude Stein, Max Jacob, André Salmon, André Breton, André Derain, Faik Konitza, Blaise Cendrars, Giuseppe Ungaretti, Pierre Reverdy, Alexandra Exter, Jean Cocteau, Erik Satie, Ossip Zadkine, Marc Chagall, Marcel Duchamp and Jean Metzinger. He became romantically involved with Marie Laurencin, who is often identified as his muse. While there, he dabbled in anarchism and spoke out as a Dreyfusard in defense of Dreyfus's innocence.

Metzinger painted the first Cubist portrait of Apollinaire. In his Vie anecdotique (16 October 1911), the poet proudly writes: "I am honoured to be the first model of a Cubist painter, Jean Metzinger, for a portrait exhibited in 1910 at the Salon des Indépendants." It was not only the first Cubist portrait, according to Apollinaire, but it was also the first great portrait of the poet exhibited in public, prior to others by Louis Marcoussis, Amedeo Modigliani, Mikhail Larionov and Picasso.

"La Joconde est Retrouvée" (The Mona Lisa is Found), Le Petit Parisien, No. 13559, 13 December 1913

In 1911 Apollinaire joined the Puteaux Group, a branch of the Cubist movement soon to be known as the Section d'Or. He delivered the opening address of the 1912 Salon de la Section d'Or — the most important pre-World War I Cubist exhibition.

On 7 September 1911, police arrested and jailed Apollinaire on suspicion of aiding and abetting the theft of the Mona Lisa and a number of Egyptian statuettes from the Louvre, but released him a week later. The theft of the statues had been committed in 1907 by a former secretary of Apollinaire, Honoré Joseph Géry Pieret, who had recently returned one of the stolen statues to the French newspaper the Paris-Journal. Apollinaire implicated his friend Picasso, who had bought Iberian statues from Pieret, and who was also brought in for questioning in the theft of the Mona Lisa, but he was also exonerated. In fact, the theft of the Mona Lisa was perpetrated by Vincenzo Peruggia, an Italian house painter who acted alone and was only caught two years later when he tried to sell the painting in Florence.

=== Cubism ===
Jean Metzinger, 1911, Étude pour le portrait de Guillaume Apollinaire, graphite on paper, 48 × 31.2 cm, Musée National d'Art Moderne, Centre Georges Pompidou, Paris

Apollinaire wrote the preface for the first Cubist exposition outside of Paris; VIII Salon des Indépendants, Brussels, 1911. In an open-handed preface to the catalogue of the Brussels Indépendants show, Apollinaire stated that these 'new painters' accepted the name of Cubists which has been given to them. He described Cubism as a new manifestation and high art [manifestation nouvelle et très élevée de l'art], not a system that constrains talent [non-point un système contraignant les talents], and the differences which characterize not only the talents but even the styles of these artists are an obvious proof of this. The artists involved with this new movement, according to Apollinaire, included Pablo Picasso (who represented Apollinaire in his Three Musicians painting), Georges Braque, Jean Metzinger, Albert Gleizes, Robert Delaunay, Fernand Léger, and Henri Le Fauconnier. By 1912 others had joined the Cubists: Jacques Villon, Marcel Duchamp, Raymond Duchamp-Villon, Francis Picabia, Juan Gris, and Roger de La Fresnaye, among them. Apollinaire prophesized that Marcel Duchamp could reconcile art and the people.

The leftmost figure in Pablo Picasso's Three Musicians painting is believed to represent Apollinaire.

=== Orphism ===
The term Orphism was coined by Apollinaire at the Salon de la Section d'Or in 1912, referring to the works of Robert Delaunay and František Kupka. During his lecture at the Section d'Or exhibit Apollinaire presented three of Kupka's abstract works as perfect examples of pure painting, as anti-figurative as music.

In Les Peintres Cubistes, Méditations Esthétiques (1913) Apollinaire described Orphism as "the art of painting new totalities with elements that the artist does not take from visual reality, but creates entirely by himself. [...] An Orphic painter's works should convey an untroubled aesthetic pleasure, but at the same time a meaningful structure and sublime significance. According to Apollinaire Orphism represented a move towards a completely new art-form, much as music was to literature. In 2025, New York's Guggenheim Museum mounted a major retrospective on Orphism, an oft-overlooked artistic movement.

=== Surrealism ===
The term Surrealism was first used by Apollinaire concerning the ballet Parade in 1917. The poet Arthur Rimbaud wanted to be a visionary, to perceive the hidden side of things within the realm of another reality. In continuity with Rimbaud, Apollinaire went in search of a hidden and mysterious reality. The term "surrealism" appeared for the first time in March 1917 (Chronologie de Dada et du surréalisme, 1917) in a letter by Apollinaire to Paul Dermée: "All things considered, I think in fact it is better to adopt surrealism than supernaturalism, which I first used" [Tout bien examiné, je crois en effet qu'il vaut mieux adopter surréalisme que surnaturalisme que j'avais d'abord employé].

He described Parade as "a kind of surrealism" (une sorte de surréalisme) when he wrote the program note the following week, thus coining the word three years before Surrealism emerged as an art movement in Paris.

=== World War I and death ===
Apollinaire served as an infantry officer in World War I and, in 1916, received a serious shrapnel wound to the temple, from which he would never fully recover. He wrote Les Mamelles de Tirésias while recovering from this wound. During this period he coined the word "Surrealism" in the programme notes for Jean Cocteau and Erik Satie's ballet Parade, first performed on 18 May 1917. He also published an artistic manifesto, L'Esprit nouveau et les poètes. Apollinaire's status as a literary critic is most famous and influential in his recognition of the Marquis de Sade, whose works were for a long time obscure, yet arising in popularity as an influence upon the Dada and Surrealist art movements going on in Montparnasse at the beginning of the twentieth century as, "The freest spirit that ever existed."

The war-weakened Apollinaire died at the age of 38 on 9 November 1918 of influenza during the Spanish flu pandemic of 1918 ravaging Europe at the time, two years after being wounded in World War I. Due to his military service for the duration of the war, he was declared to have "Died for France" (Mort pour la France) by the French government. He was interred in the Père Lachaise Cemetery, Paris.

== Works ==
In 1900 he wrote his first novel Mirely, ou le petit trou pas cher (pornographic), which was eventually lost. Apollinaire's first collection of poetry was L'enchanteur pourrissant (1909), but Alcools (1913) established his reputation. The poems, influenced in part by the Symbolists, juxtapose the old and the new, combining traditional poetic forms with modern imagery. In 1913, Apollinaire published the essay Les Peintres Cubistes, Méditations Esthétiques on the Cubist painters, a movement which he helped to define. He also coined the term orphism to describe a tendency towards absolute abstraction in the paintings of Robert Delaunay and others. In 1917, Apollinaire produced Peintures de Léopold Survage; Dessins et aquarelles d’Irène Lagut (Paintings by Léopold Survage; Drawings and Watercolors by Irène Lagut), which is included in the permanent collection of Pérez Art Museum Miami, in the United States.

In 1907 Apollinaire published the well-known erotic novel, The Eleven Thousand Rods (Les Onze Mille Verges). Officially banned in France until 1970, various printings of it circulated widely for many years. Apollinaire never publicly acknowledged authorship of the novel. Another erotic novel attributed to him was The Exploits of a Young Don Juan (Les exploits d'un jeune Don Juan), in which the 15-year-old hero fathers three children with various members of his entourage, including his aunt. Apollinaire's gift to Picasso of the original 1907 manuscript was one of the artist's most prized possessions. The book was made into a movie in 1986.

Shortly after his death, Mercure de France published Calligrammes, a collection of his concrete poetry (poetry in which typography and layout adds to the overall effect), and more orthodox, though still modernist poems informed by Apollinaire's experiences in the First World War and in which he often used the technique of automatic writing.

In his youth Apollinaire lived for a short while in Belgium, mastering the Walloon dialect sufficiently to write poetry, some of which has survived.

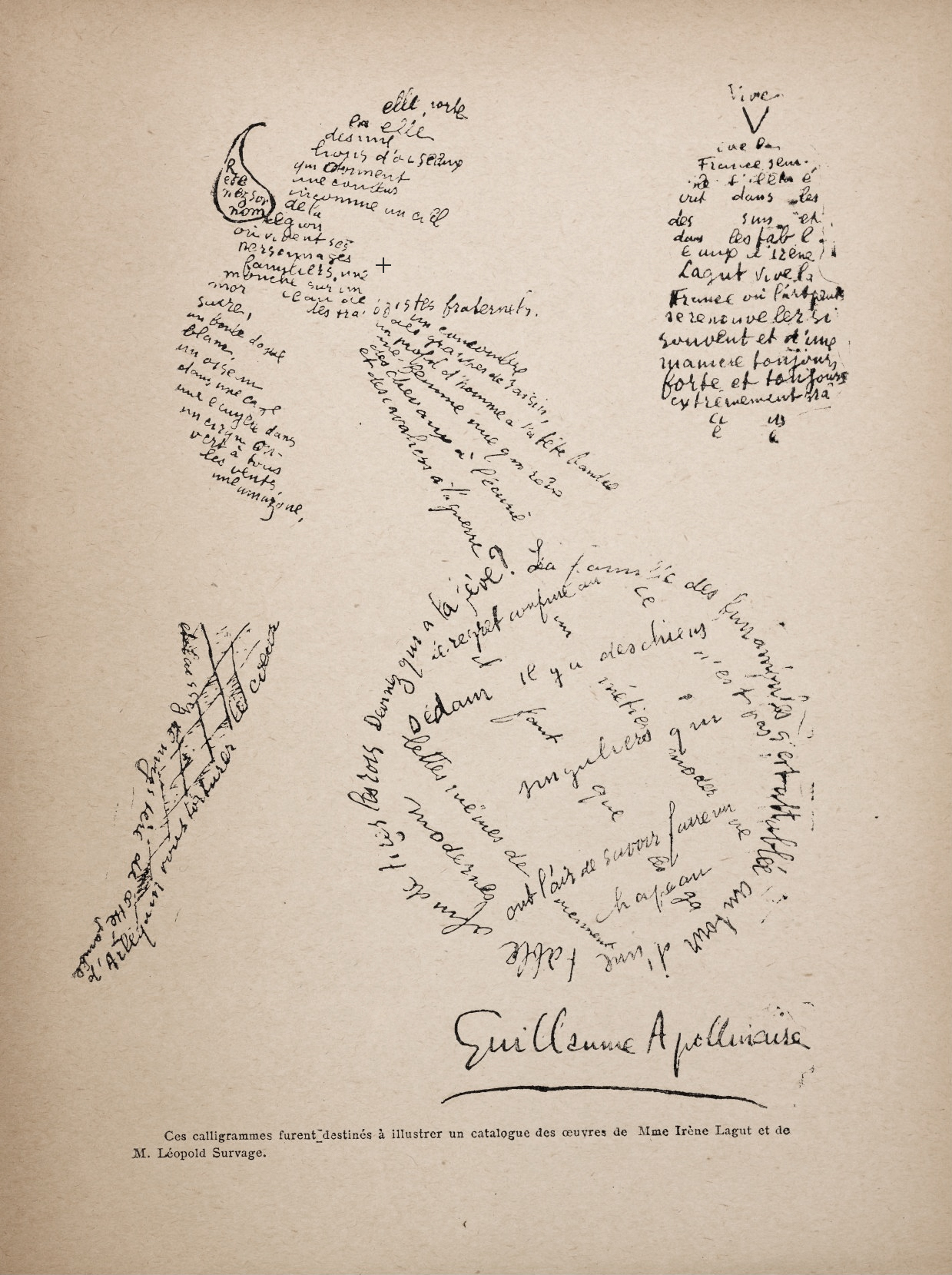
A Calligramme by Guillaume Apollinaire

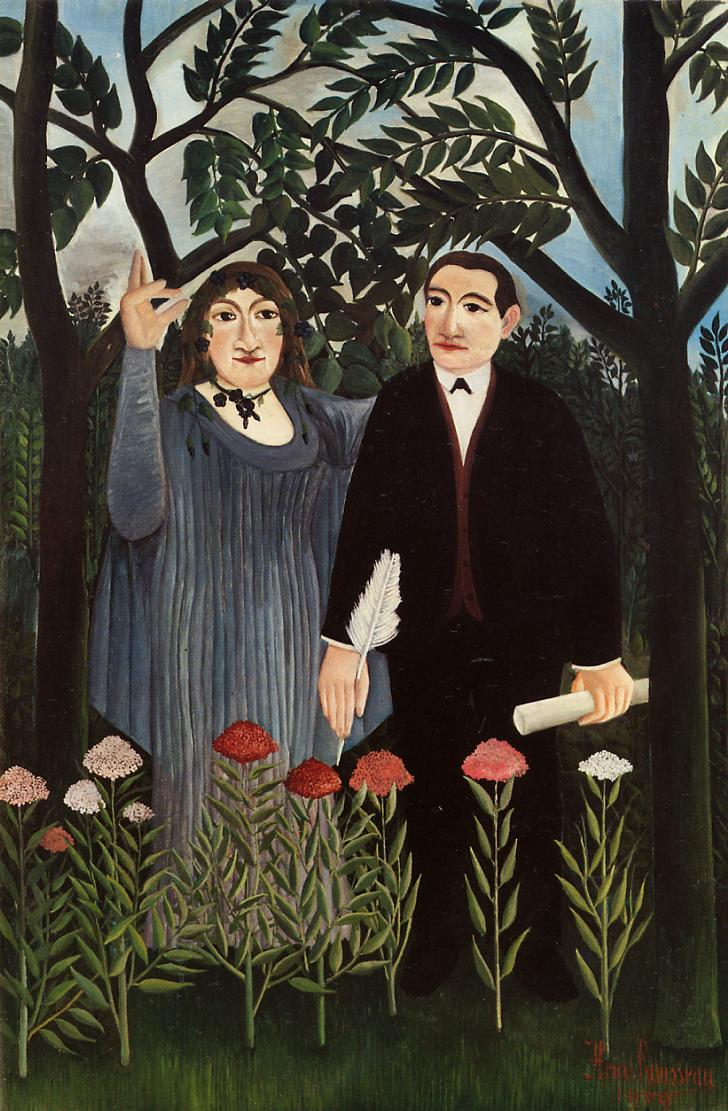
The Muse Inspiring the Poet, portrait of Apollinaire and Marie Laurencin, by Henri Rousseau, 1909

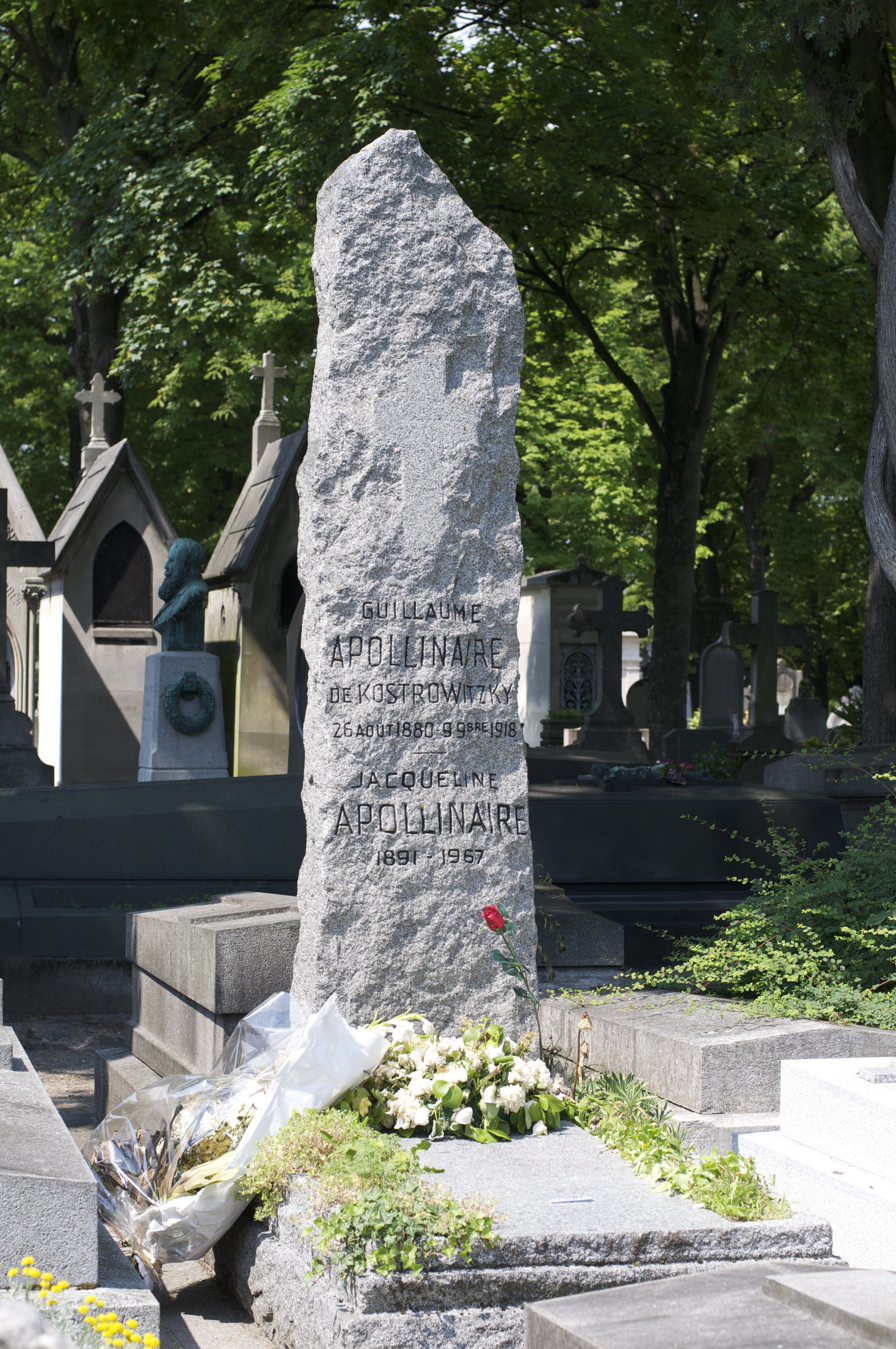
Apollinaire's grave in Père Lachaise Cemetery

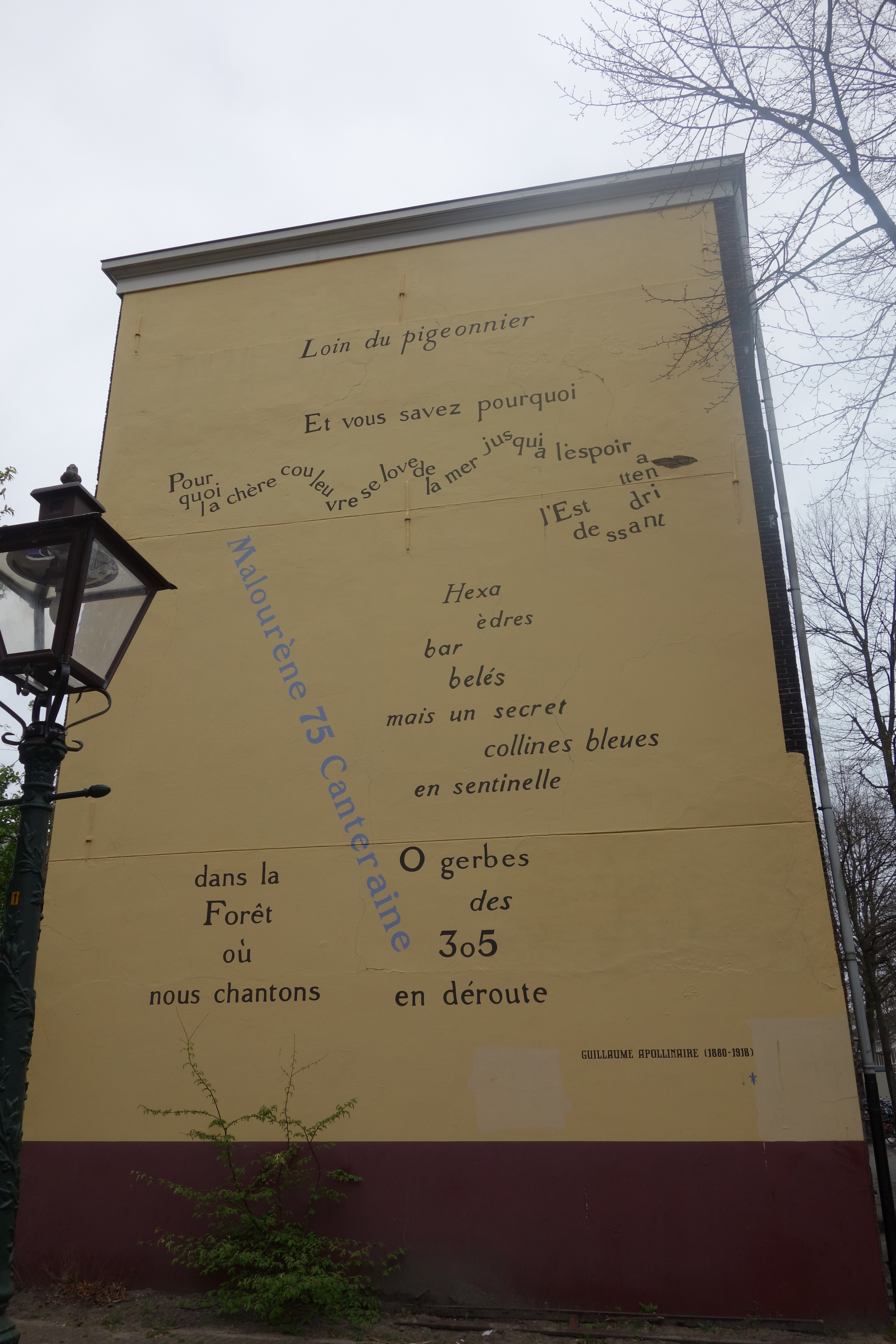
Poem by Apollinaire on a wall in Leiden

=== Poetry ===
- L'enchanteur pourrissant (1909). The Enchanter Rotting
- Le Bestiaire ou Cortège d'Orphée (1911)
- Alcools (1913)
- Vitam impendere amori (1917)
- Calligrammes, poèmes de la paix et de la guerre 1913–1916 (1918) (published shortly after Apollinaire's death)
- Il y a... (1925) Albert Messein
- Julie ou la rose (1927)
- Ombre de mon amour (1947). Poems addressed to Louise de Coligny-Châtillon
- Poèmes secrets à Madeleine (1949). Pirated edition
- Le Guetteur mélancolique (1952). Previously unpublished works
- Poèmes à Lou (1955)
- Soldes (1985). Previously unpublished works
- Et moi aussi je suis peintre (2006). Album of drawings for Calligrammes, from a private collection
- Calligrammaire, les calligrammes de Guillaume Apollinaire / Kalligrammatika, Guillaume Apollinaire kalligrammái (2025). Bilingual French–Hungarian edition

=== Novels ===
- Mirely ou le Petit Trou pas cher (1900). Mirely, or The Cheap Little Hole (unpublished)
- Que faire ? (1900). What to Do?
- Les Onze Mille Verges ou les Amours d'un hospodar (1907). The Eleven Thousand Rods; The Debauched Hospodar
- Les Exploits d'un jeune Don Juan (1911). The Amorous Exploits of a Young Rakehell, trans. Reaves Tessor (1959)
- La Rome des Borgia (1914). The Rome of the Borgias
- La Fin de Babylone (1914). The Fall of Babylon
- Les Trois Don Juan (1915). The Three Don Juans
- La Femme assise (1920). The Sitting Woman

=== Short story collections ===
- L'Hérèsiarque et Cie (1910). The Heresiarch and Co., trans. Rémy Inglis Hall (1965)
- Le Poète assassiné (1916). The Poet Assassinated, trans. Matthew Josephson (1923, title story); trans. Ron Padgett (1968, unabridged)
- Les Épingles (1928). The Pins

=== Plays ===
- Les Mamelles de Tirésias (1917). The Breasts of Tiresias
- La Bréhatine (1917). Screenplay (collaboration with André Billy)
- Couleurs du temps (1918)
- Casanova (published 1952)

=== Articles ===
- Le Théâtre italien, illustrated encyclopedia, 1910
- Preface, Catalogue of 8th Salon annuel du Cercle d'art Les Indépendants, Musée moderne de Bruxelles, 10 June – 3 July 1911.
- La Vie anecdotique, Chroniques dans Le Mercure de France, 1911–1918
- Pages d'histoire, chronique des grands siècles de France, chronicles, 1912
- Les Peintres Cubistes, Méditations Esthétiques, 1913
- La Peinture moderne, 1913
- L'Antitradition futuriste, manifeste synthèse, 1913
- Jean Metzinger à la Galerie Weill, Chroniques d'art de Guillaume Apollinaire, L'Intransigeant, Paris Journal, 27 May 1914
- Case d'Armons, 1915
- L'esprit nouveau et les poètes, 1918
- Le Flâneur des Deux Rives, chronicles, 1918

=== Translations into English ===
- The Poet Assassinated, trans. Matthew Josephson (The Broom Publishing, 1923)
- Selected Writings, trans. Roger Shattuck (New Directions, 1948)
- Alcools: Poems 1898–1913, trans. Walter Meredith (Doubleday, 1964)
- Alcools, trans. Anne Hyde Greet (University of California Press, 1965)
- Selected Poems, trans. Oliver Bernard (Penguin, 1965; expanded, bilingual edition, Anvil Press, 1986)
- The Heresiarch and Co., trans. Rémy Inglis Hall (1965), published in the UK as The Wandering Jew and Other Stories (1967)
- The Poet Assassinated, trans. Ron Padgett (Holt, Rinehart & Winston, 1968)
- Calligrams, trans. Anne Hyde Greet (Unicorn Press, 1970)
- Apollinaire on Art: Essays and Reviews, 1902–1918, trans. Susan Suleiman (1972)
- Zone, trans. Samuel Beckett (Dolmen Press, 1972)
- Alcools: Poems, trans. Donald Revell (Wesleyan University Press, 1995)
- The Self-Dismembered Man: Selected Later Poems, trans. Donald Revell (Wesleyan University Press, 2004)
- The Little Auto, trans. Beverley Bie Brahic (CB editions, 2012)
- "Zone", trans. David Lehman, in Virginia Quarterly Review (2013)
- Zone: Selected Poems, trans. Ron Padgett (New York Review Books, 2015)
- Selected Poems, trans. Martin Sorrell (Oxford University Press, 2015)
- The Flaneur of Paris, trans. Alex Andriesse (Hermits United, 2026)

== In popular culture ==
- French composer Francis Poulenc has set Apollinaire's poems to music in his five-part song cycle Banalités (1940), which in turned inspired Pink Martini's song Sympathique (je ne veux pas travailler) in 1997.
- Dutch composer Marjo Tal set some of Apollinaire’s poetry to music.
- French composer Denise Roger set Apollinaire’s poetry to music.
- Apollinaire is played by Seth Gabel in the 2018 television series Genius, which focuses on the life and work of Pablo Picasso.

== See also ==
- La Chanson du mal-aimé, oratorio by Léo Ferré on Apollinaire's eponymous poem (from Alcools)
- Monostich
- Prix Guillaume Apollinaire

== References and sources ==
Sources

- Apollinaire, Marcel Adéma, 1954
- Apollinaire, Poet among the Painters, Francis Steegmuller, 1963, 1971, 1973
- Apollinaire, M. Davies, 1964
- Guillaume Apollinaire, S. Bates, 1967
- Guillaume Apollinaire, P. Adéma, 1968
- The Banquet Years, Roger Shattuck, 1968
- Apollinaire, R. Couffignal, 1975
- Guillaume Apollinaire, L.C. Breuning, 1980
- Reading Apollinaire, T. Mathews, 1987
- Guillaume Apollinaire, J. Grimm, 1993
