= Alcools =

Poetry collection by Guillaume Apollinaire

Alcools (English: Alcohols) is a collection of poems by the French author Guillaume Apollinaire. His first major collection, it was published in 1913.

The first poem in the collection, Zone (an epic poem of Paris), has been called "the great poem of early Modernism" by the scholar Martin Sorrell.

== Preparation and publication ==
Apollinaire's first substantial work, Alcools appeared in April 1913, printed in 567 copies on the presses of Mercure de France. It contained fifty poems and a Cubist portrait of Apollinaire by his friend Pablo Picasso as a frontispiece.

The collection had a slow gestation: it assembles unpublished texts and selected poems composed between 1898 and 1912. It includes fragments from a proposed collection titled Le Vent du Rhin, which Apollinaire abandoned to devote himself to a larger work, within which he would reserve a section titled Rhénanes for nine poems inspired by a stay in Germany from 1901 to 1902. After extensive revisions to many of the pieces, the collection was ready in the summer of 1912. However, by the time the first proofs were being corrected in the autumn, Apollinaire decided to change the title from Eau de Vie in favor of Alcools. He also inserted two new poems: Zone and Chantre. The final print date was April 20, 1913.

Apollinaire was not content with gathering his earlier and more recent works. He worked carefully on both the texts (not hesitating to transplant sections from one to another) and the overall arrangement of the collection, whose heterogeneous appearance conceals a true editorial reflection.

"...it's a kind of marquetry. So to say, [Apollinaire] will make a poem, he will take some verses, he will move the verses to put them elsewhere in another poem, so the verses will be totally transplanted, disoriented if I may say so. He will take bits like that which come from either verse or prose and he puts things in his own way. For example, in Alcools, La Maison des morts was first written as a prose tale which he then cut into verse form." —Laurence Campa, How "Alcools" shook poetry up. France Culture, June 20 2022.

== Themes and style ==
From a thematic perspective, the poems in Alcools draw heavily on Apollinaire's own life: for example, his unhappy love life, travels, and legal setbacks. The author also allots much room for metaphysical anxiety, nostalgia, and especially modernity.

With its alternation of elegiac and humorous pieces, as well as ones that differ in length (for example, Cantor consists of a single verse), Alcools at first glance presents a deliberately heterogeneous aspect. This reflects both the evolution of the author over time, as well as his eclectic culture and tastes for the provocative, picturesque, and scandalous. However, the carefully deliberated structure of the collection gives the whole a structure that partly compensates for its diverse appearance.

In terms of poetic technique, Apollinaire uses both classical verses and forms as well as free verse without regular meter, rhythm, or stanza. He often uses collages and creates, within the same poem, a patchwork effect.

The total absence of punctuation throughout the collection, adopted at the last minute by Apollinaire during the correction of the proofs, has generated much fascination, particularly to trace the anteriority of this innovation. Beyond this controversy, Apollinaire justifies this radical and much-noted decision: "As far as punctuation is concerned, I only removed it because it seemed useless to me and it in fact is; the very rhythm and the cut of the verses are the true punctuation and there is no need for another".

The style of the volume (intrusion by modernity, free verse, absence of punctuation, discordances) has been compared to the Cubist aesthetic:

"It has roughly the same effect as when, in the same era, we see a Cubist painting for the first time; that is to say a painting where there is no linear perspective but we see a situation, a character, a landscape in all its dimensions at the same time. And suddenly your eye no longer has any reference points. When you remove the punctuation after a while your eye no longer has any reference points either and it is forced to create its own reference points. It really disconcerted people at the time and, after him, we started to write without punctuation and that seemed normal to us, at least for poetry." —Laurence Campa, How "Alcools" shook poetry up. France Culture, June 20 2022.

== Controversy ==
In the years following the publication of Alcools, and especially after the death of Guillaume Apollinaire, a controversy emerged concerning the numerous similarities between the poem Zone, which opens the collection, and Les Pâques à New-York (Easter in New York) by Blaise Cendrars. The young poet, who was a great admirer of Apollinaire, had addressed this to him in November of 1913, shortly after its publication. The reconstruction of the chronology, textual analysis of the genesis of the two poems, research, and notes by the respective authors seem to indicate that Apollinaire was indeed inspired, voluntarily or not, by Les Pâques for the final version of Zone, particularly about the total absence of punctuation that Apollinaire (who practiced it since 1912 with Vendémiaire) applied to Zone and extended to all of the poems of Alcools.

== Reception ==
In the French literary scene, within which Apollinaire then appeared, depending on the point of view, the publication had a great impact as a provocateur or leader of a modernist movement. The work, also noticed in Germany and Italy, was also mentioned by Ezra Pound.

Like Georges Duhamel, (who, however, spares the sequel À la Santé), critics criticize the collection for its heterogeneous character, certain linguistic negligences as well as easy provocations such as the absence of punctuation. For those, warned against the promoter of Cubism and disconcerted by the aesthetic of surprise, the work resembles a "kaleidoscope" or a "flea market". The most virulent critics evoke the cosmopolitan origins of the author or take inspiration from the title of the collection to speak of drunkenness.

"... a host of heterogeneous objects have ended up in this hovel, some of which are valuable, but none of which are the product of the merchant's industry. This is indeed one of the characteristics of the second-hand market: it resells; it does not manufacture. Moreover, it sometimes resells curious things; one may find, in its filthy displays, a valuable stone mounted on a nail. All this comes from far away, but the stone is pleasant to look at. For the rest, it is an assemblage of fake paintings, exotic and patched clothing, bicycle accessories and private hygiene instruments. A truculent and dazzling variety takes the place of art, in the assembly of objects. It is only through the holes of a shabby chasuble that one can barely see the ironic and candid gaze of the merchant, who is at once a Levantine Jew, a South American, a Polish gentleman and a facchino." — Georges Duhamel, Le Mercure du France, no. 384, June 15, 1913.

Defenders of the collection, on the contrary, praise "its colorful charm, its singular erudition, its new lyricism and the powerful spell of its images".

In the long run, the admirers (including Paul Léautaud, Max Jacob, Blaise Cendrars, Pierre Reverdy, Francis Carco, Jean Royére, the Surrealists, and the Rochefort School) would win their case. The poems of Alcools, which became the manifesto of modern poetry, would be set to music by Arthur Honnegger and Francis Poulenc, and sung by Léo Ferré and Yves Montand. They are now commonly taught in schools and universities.

== The poems of the collection, in alphabetic order ==
- 1909
- À la Santé
- Automne malade
- Automne
- Annie
- Chantre
- Clair de lune
- Clotilde
- Cors de chasse
- Cortège
- Crépuscule
- Hôtels
- L'Adieu
- L'Émigrant de Landor Road
- L'Ermite
- La Blanche Neige
- La Chanson du Mal Aimé
- La Dame
- La Loreley
- La Maison des morts
- La Porte
- La Synagogue
- La Tzigane
- Le Brasier
- Le Larron
- Le Pont Mirabeau
- Le Vent nocturne
- Le Voyageur
- Les Cloches
- Les Colchiques
- Les Femmes
- Les Fiançailles
- Les Sapins
- Lul de Faltenin
- Mai
- Marie
- Marizibill
- Merlin et la Vieille Femme
- Nuit rhénane
- Palais
- Poème lu au mariage d'André Salmon
- Rhénane d'automne
- Rosemonde
- Salomé
- Saltimbanques
- Schinderhannes
- Signe
- Un soir
- Vendémiaire
- Zone (voir : Pihis)

== Posterity ==
Alcools was ranked seventeenth of one hundred in Le Monde's 100 Books of the Century in 1999.
