= Les Onze Mille Verges =

Pornographic novel by Apollinaire, published in 1907

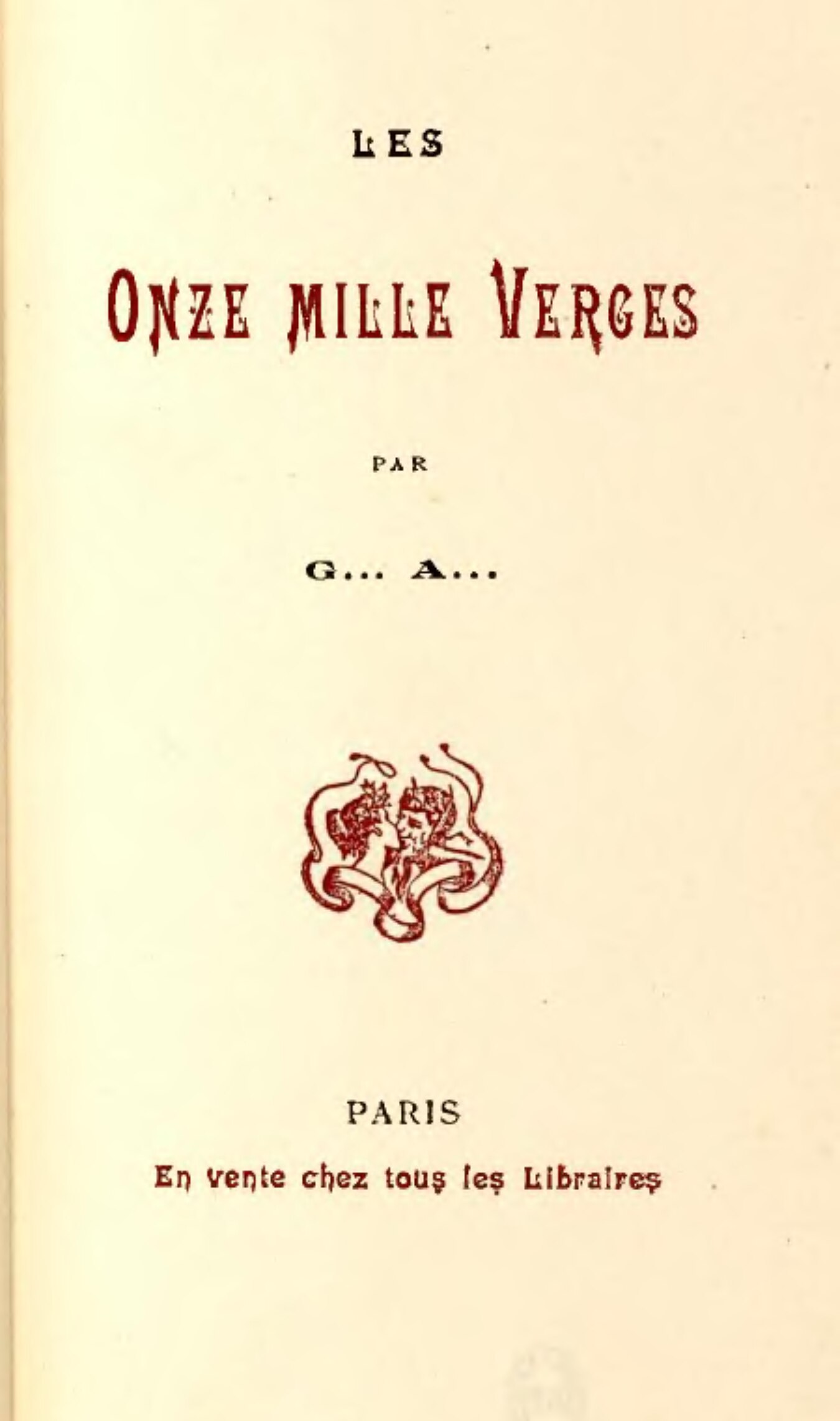
Page 17 of Les Onze Mille Verges

Les Onze Mille Verges ou les Amours d'un hospodar is a pornographic novel by French author Guillaume Apollinaire, published in 1907 over his initials "G.A.". The title contains a play on the Catholic veneration of the "Eleven thousand Virgins" (French: les onze mille vierges), the martyred companions of Saint Ursula, replacing the word vierge (virgin) with verge (rod) due to a slip of the tongue by the protagonist and as an omen of his fate. The use of the word verge may also be considered as a pun, for it is used as a vulgarism for the male member. Hospodar is a Slavic honorific.

It was translated into English by Alexander Trocchi (using the pseudonym "Oscar Mole") as The Debauched Hospodar (1953); by Nina Rootes as Les onze mille verges: or, The Amorous Adventures of Prince Mony Vibescu (1976); and later by Alexis Lykiard as The Eleven Thousand Rods (2008).

== Literary background ==
Les Onze Mille Verges draws on the work of earlier erotic writers, including the Marquis de Sade, Rétif de la Bretonne, André Robert de Nerciat and Pietro Aretino.

== Theme ==
Les Onze Mille Verges tells the fictional story of the Romanian hospodar Prince Mony Vibescu, in which Apollinaire explores all aspects of sexuality: sadism alternates with masochism; ondinism / scatophilia with vampirism; pedophilia with gerontophilia; masturbation with group sex; lesbianism with male homosexuality. The writing is alert, fresh and concrete, humour is always present, and the entire novel exudes an "infernal joy", which finds its apotheosis in the final scene.

== Reception ==
Admirers of Les Onze Mille Verges included Louis Aragon, Robert Desnos and Pablo Picasso, who dubbed the novel Apollinaire's masterpiece.

== Case before the ECHR ==
In a case lodged before the European Court of Human Rights by a Turkish publisher of the novel, for his conviction in 2000 under the Turkish Criminal Code "for publishing obscene or immoral material liable to arouse and exploit sexual desire among the population”, followed by the seizure and destruction of all the copies of the book and a fine for the publisher, the Court found in 2010 that the Turkish authorities had violated Article 10 of the European Convention on Human Rights protecting the freedom of expression. The Court stated that the work belonged to the “European literary heritage”. In a different case judge Bonello, in his concurring opinion, after citing the description of the book from Wikipedia, described the work as a "smear of transcendental smut”.

== Film adaptation ==
A film adaptation by Eric Lipman appeared in France in 1975. It was released in English as "Garden of Beauty" and as "The 11,000 Sexes".
