= Louise de Coligny-Châtillon =

French aviator

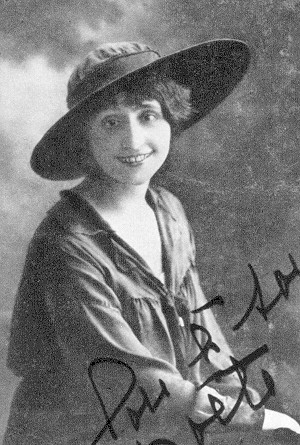
- Born: July 30, 1881; Vesoul
- Died: May 26, 1963 (aged 78)

Geneviève Marguerite Marie-Louise de Pillot de Coligny, most know as Louise de Coligny-Châtillon, born July 30, 1881 in Vesoul and died October 7, 1963 in the swiss city of Geneva was one of the first French aviators.
