= Le Pont aux Anglais, soleil couchant =

1905 painting by Robert Antoine Pinchon

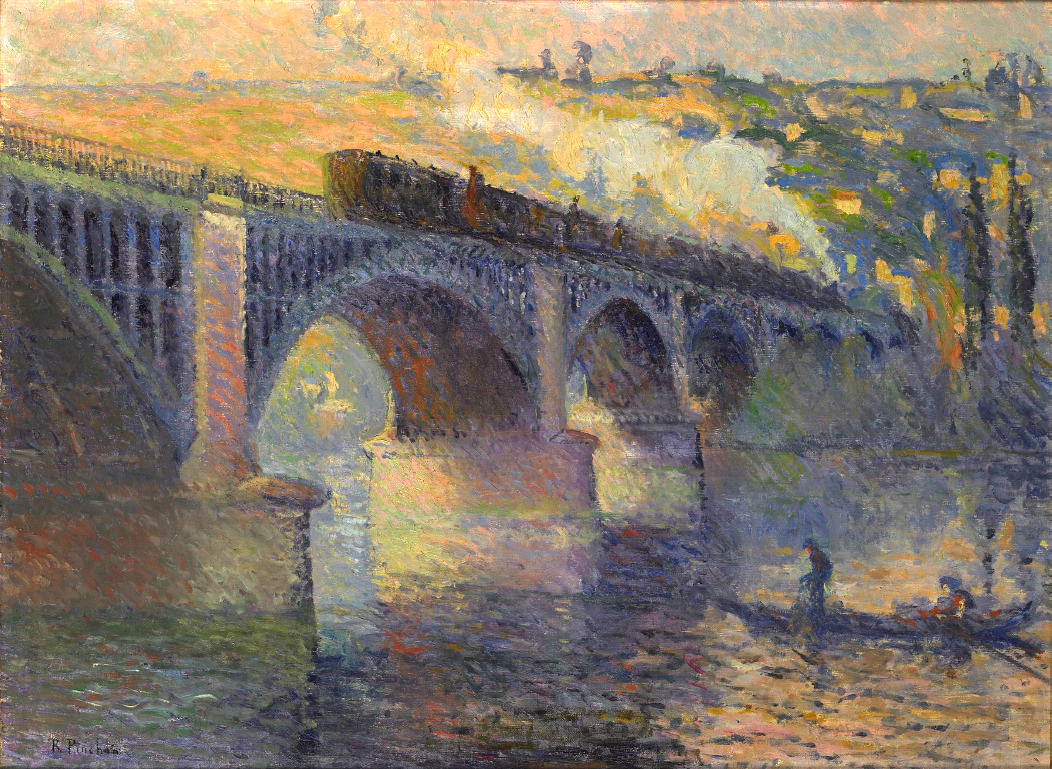
- Artist: Robert Antoine Pinchon
- Year: 1905
- Medium: Oil on canvas
- Dimensions: 54 cm × 73 cm (21.25 in × 28.75 in)
- Location: Musée des Beaux-Arts de Rouen, Rouen

Le Pont aux Anglais, soleil couchant is an oil painting created in 1905 by the French artist Robert Antoine Pinchon (1886–1943). Associated with the new generation of l'École de Rouen Pinchon executed this work in a Post-Impressionist style with a subdued Fauve or Neo-Impressionist palette of golden yellows and incandescent blues. The dynamic image of the train in Pinchon's painting is an homage to the emerging industrialized world.

The work was exhibited in April 1905 at the Galerie Legrip in Rouen (see photograph), and again at the Musée des Beaux-Arts de Rouen; inauguration 13 November 1909. In the collection of François Depeaux at the time, Le Pont aux Anglais, soleil couchant was purchased by the Musée des Beaux-Arts de Rouen in 1909 where it currently forms part of the permanent collection.

== Description ==
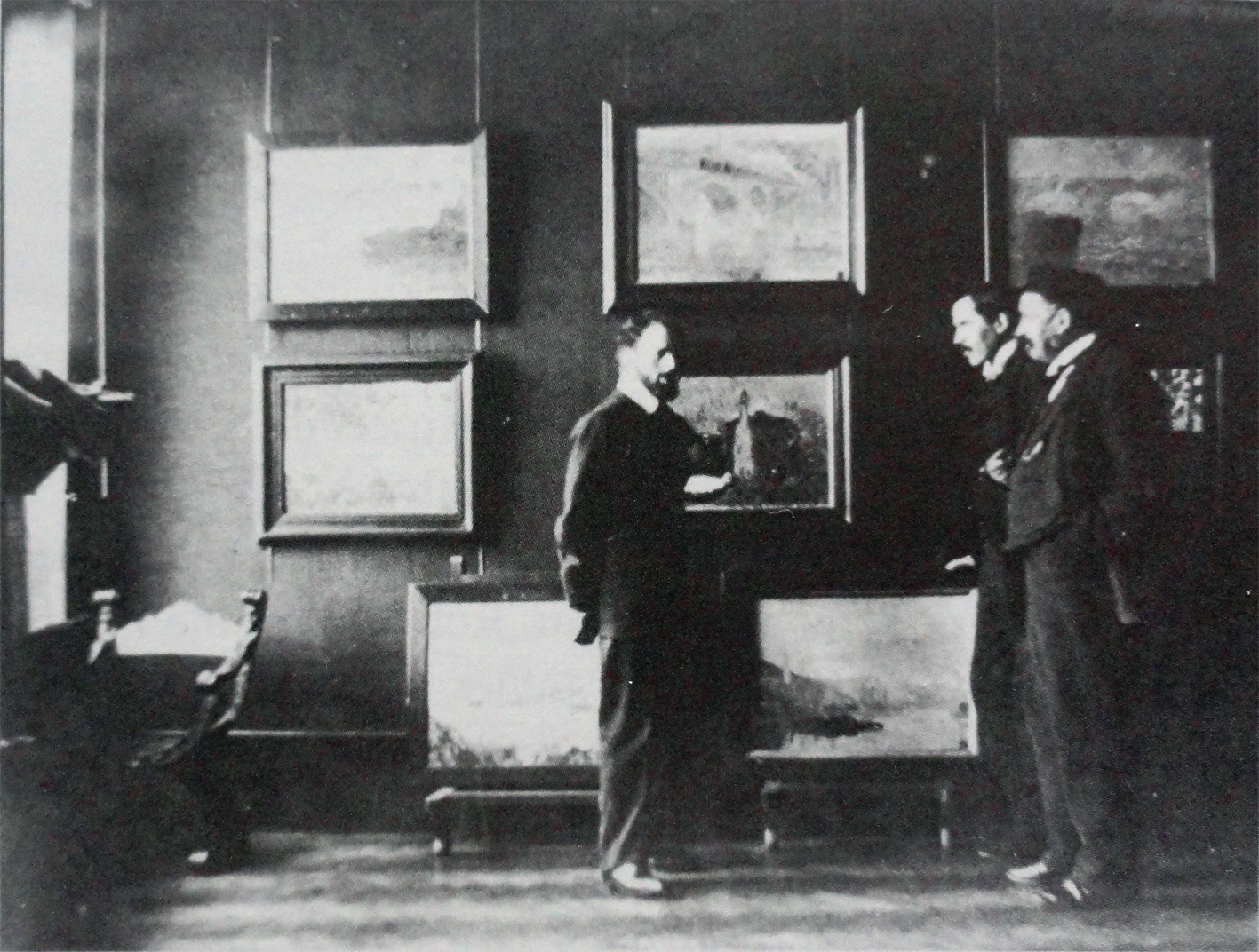
Robert Antoine Pinchon (left), Galerie Legrip, Rouen, April 1905. At this 27 April – 13 May show, Pinchon, at the age of 19, exhibited 24 paintings, one of which is Le Pont aux Anglais, soleil couchant (top center). The two persons on the right are unidentified, though one may be art collector François Depeaux.

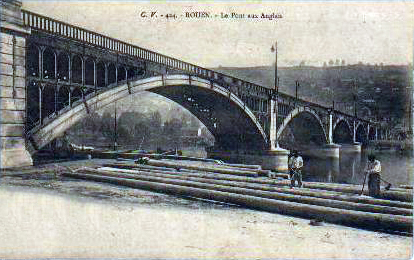
Le Pont aux Anglais, in Rouen

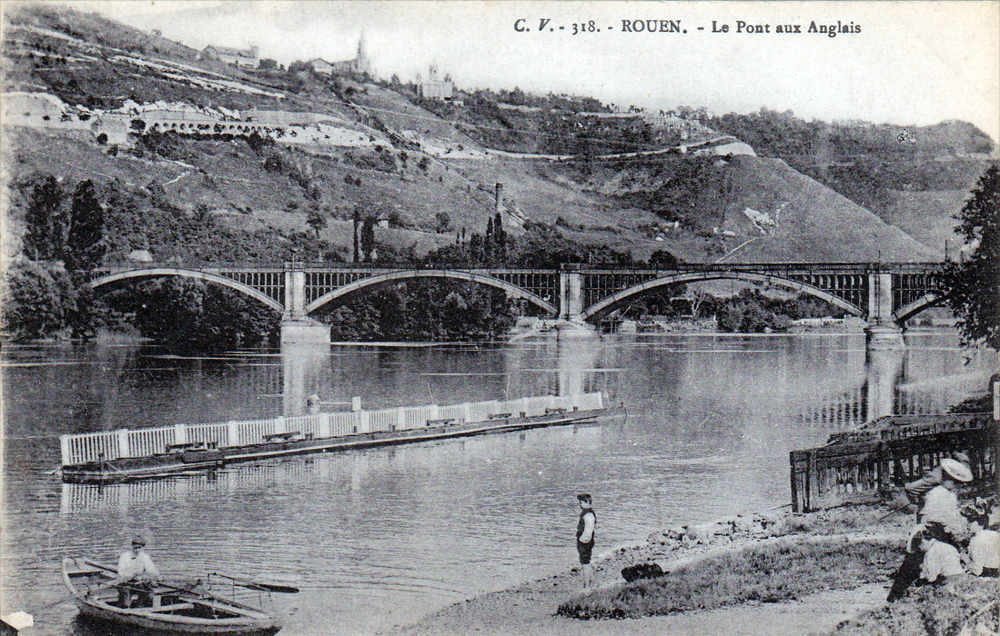
Rouen, Le Pont aux Anglais

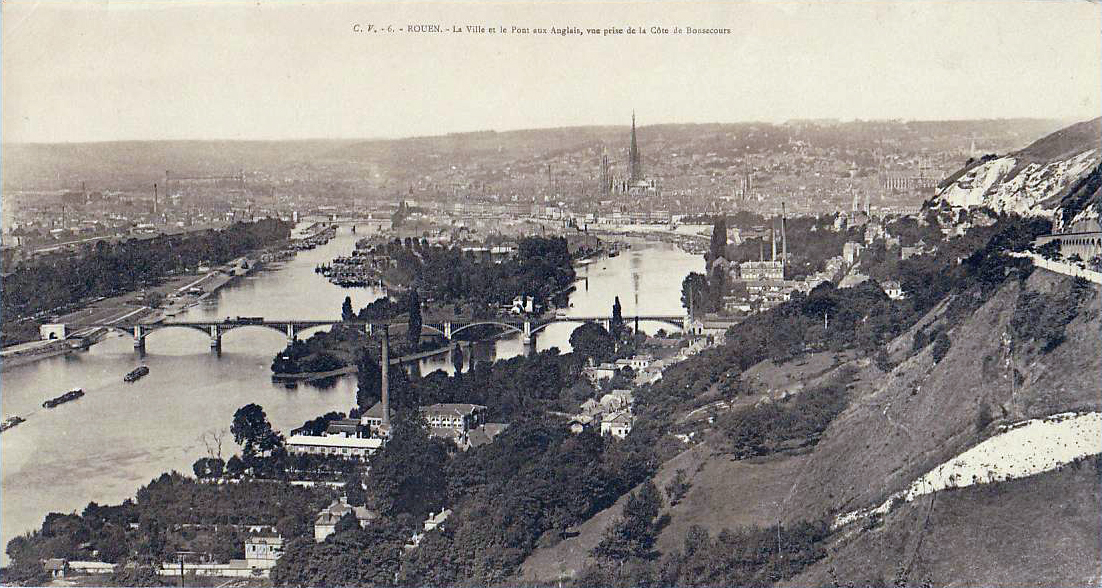
Rouen, La Ville et le Pont aux Anglais

Le Pont aux Anglais, soleil couchant is an oil painting on canvas in a horizontal format with dimensions 54 x 73 cm (21.25 by 28.75 in), signed R Pinchon lower left. The composition painted en plein air (sur le motif, in the open air), is dominated by the Pont aux Anglais, Rouen, with receding perspective tending towards the right side of the canvas. A locomotive and train cars pass over the bridge leaving a trail of steam in the direction of the receding perspective, carrying the eye towards the right, where below, a boat passes carrying two people a short distance from Le Pont aux Anglais. The rhythmic arches of the bridge and the speeding train create a sense of dynamism and modernity not often found in Post-Impressionist works. The colors Pinchon has chosen to depict this late afternoon scene are both warm and cool. The golden yellow highlights generated by the setting sun, off the canvas to the left, are juxtaposed against the grays, blues, violets and greens of the background hillside, the bridge and its massive base pillars, the poplar trees and the River Seine in the foreground.

== Le Pont aux Anglais ==
The first railway station of Rouen was built on the left bank in 1843. The government authorized the continuation of the line to Le Havre and Dieppe the same year. It was therefore decided to build a bridge to the end of the Brouilly island (now connected to the Lacroix island), leading to the tunnel under the Côte Sainte-Catherine. The bridge, located in the Rouen metropolitan area, linking Paris and Le Havre, was named the English Bridge because many workers who built it were of English nationality. It is also called the Viaduc d'Eauplet, after the neighborhood where it is located.

The bridge originally consisted of wooden arches resting on piles of masonry. It was located a little further downstream than the existing bridge. It was inaugurated in 1847. A few months after its inauguration, in 1848, two arches on the side of the left bank were set on fire during a riot. It was then rebuilt. In 1856 the wooden arches were replaced by cast iron. This is the bridge that Pinchon painted. These arches proved fragile and it was decided to build a new bridge in 1912. Despite its destruction during the Second World War, the bridge completed and operational in 1914 is still used today.

== 1909 ==
Robert Antoine Pinchon's first solo exhibition in Paris took place on 15–25 March 1909 at the Galerie des Artistes Modernes run by Chaine and Simonson, with thirty works listed in the catalogue. The show resulted in both sales and press coverage. This was followed by another show at the Galerie Legrip in Rouen on 30 June. A few months later, on 13 November, the Musée des Beaux-Arts de Rouen, opened a show with fifty-two paintings: three by Claude Monet, nine by Alfred Sisley, three by Armand Guillaumin, one by Auguste Renoir, thirteen by Albert Lebourg, five by Joseph Delattre, two by Charles Frechon and four by Robert Antoine Pinchon (now almost twenty-three years old); Péniches dans la brume, Vue pris du Mont-Garan, Effet de neige, and Le Pont aux Anglais, soleil couchant.

In 1909 Pinchon, Pierre Dumont, Pierre Hodé and Eugène Tirvert founded the Société Normande de Peinture Moderne, attracting the participation of Georges Braque, Henri Matisse, Raoul Dufy, Maurice de Vlaminck, André Derain, Albert Marquet, Othon Friesz, Francis Picabia and Roger de La Fresnaye. The same year, four paintings by Pinchon entered the collection of the Musée des Beaux-Arts de Rouen.

== Related works ==
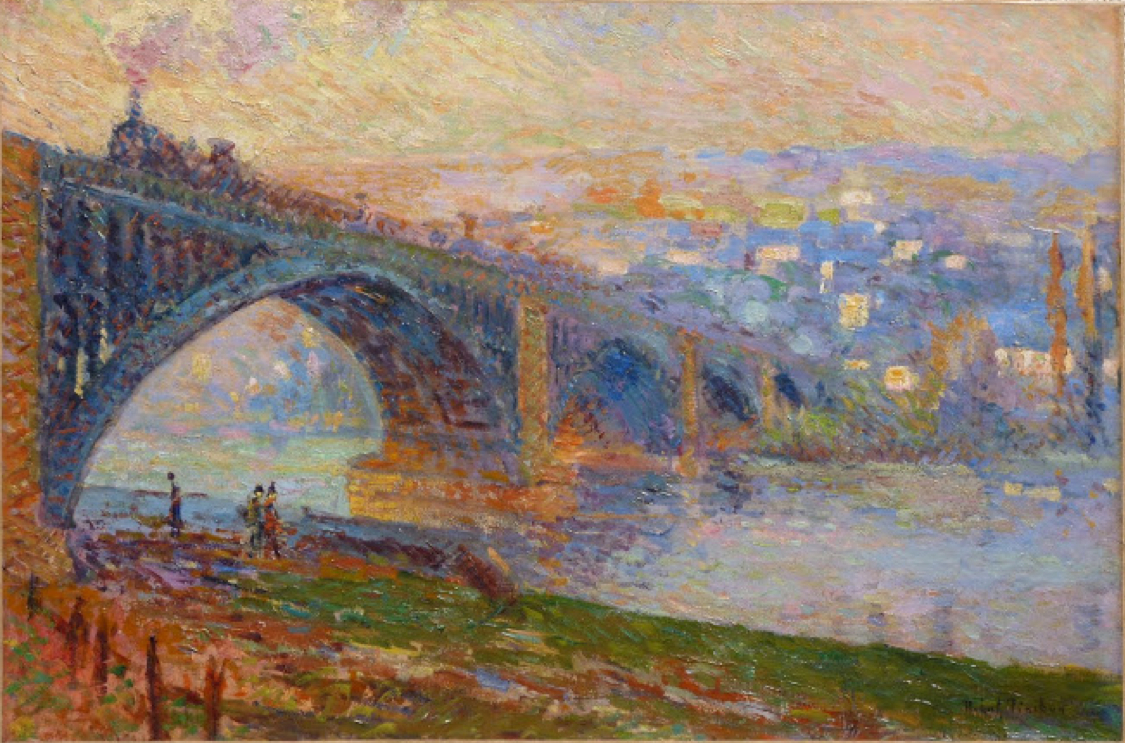
Robert Antoine Pinchon, c.1905, Rouen, Le Pont aux Anglais. Possibly a study for Le Pont aux Anglais, soleil couchant

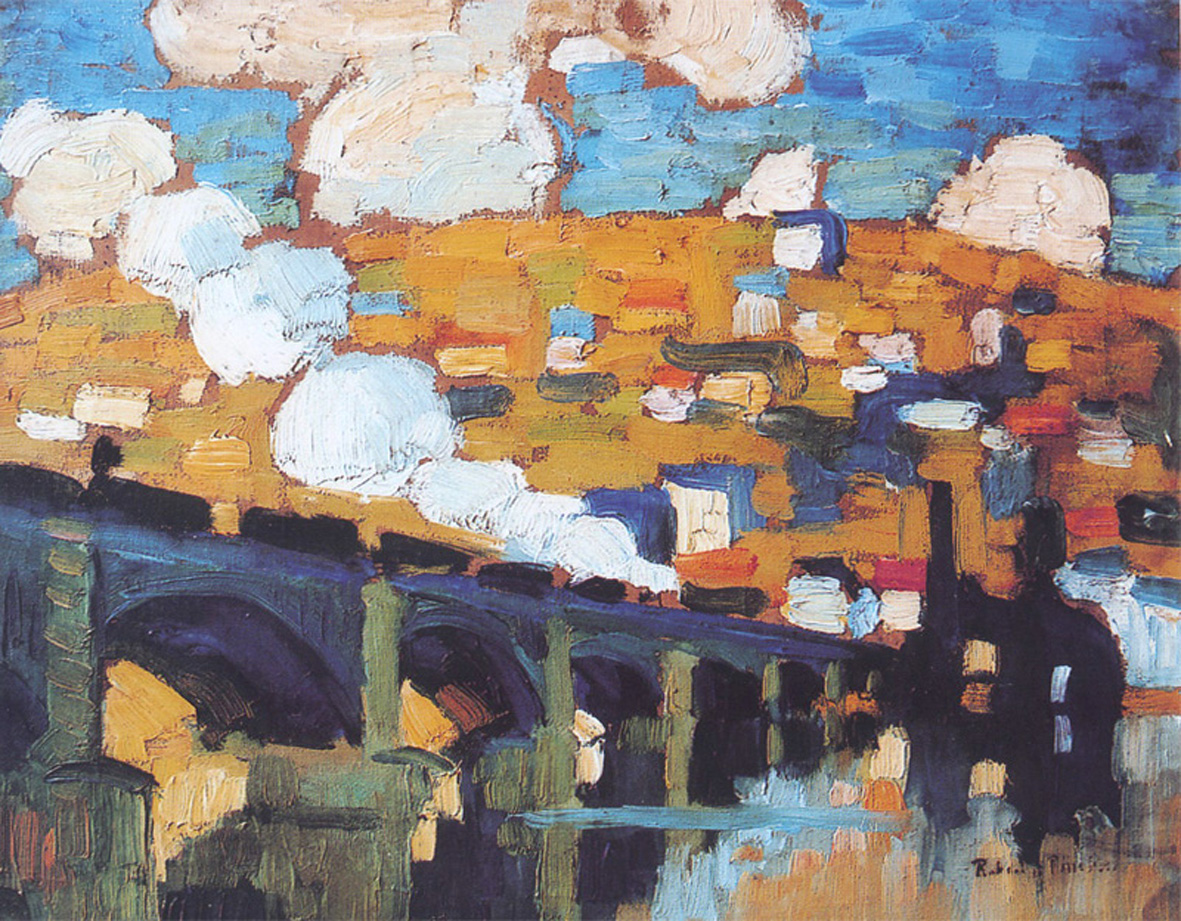
Robert Antoine Pinchon, 1905, Le Pont aux Anglais, Rouen, oil on canvas, 38 x 46 cm, private collection. It is unclear whether this work was painted before of after Le Pont aux Anglais, soleil couchant

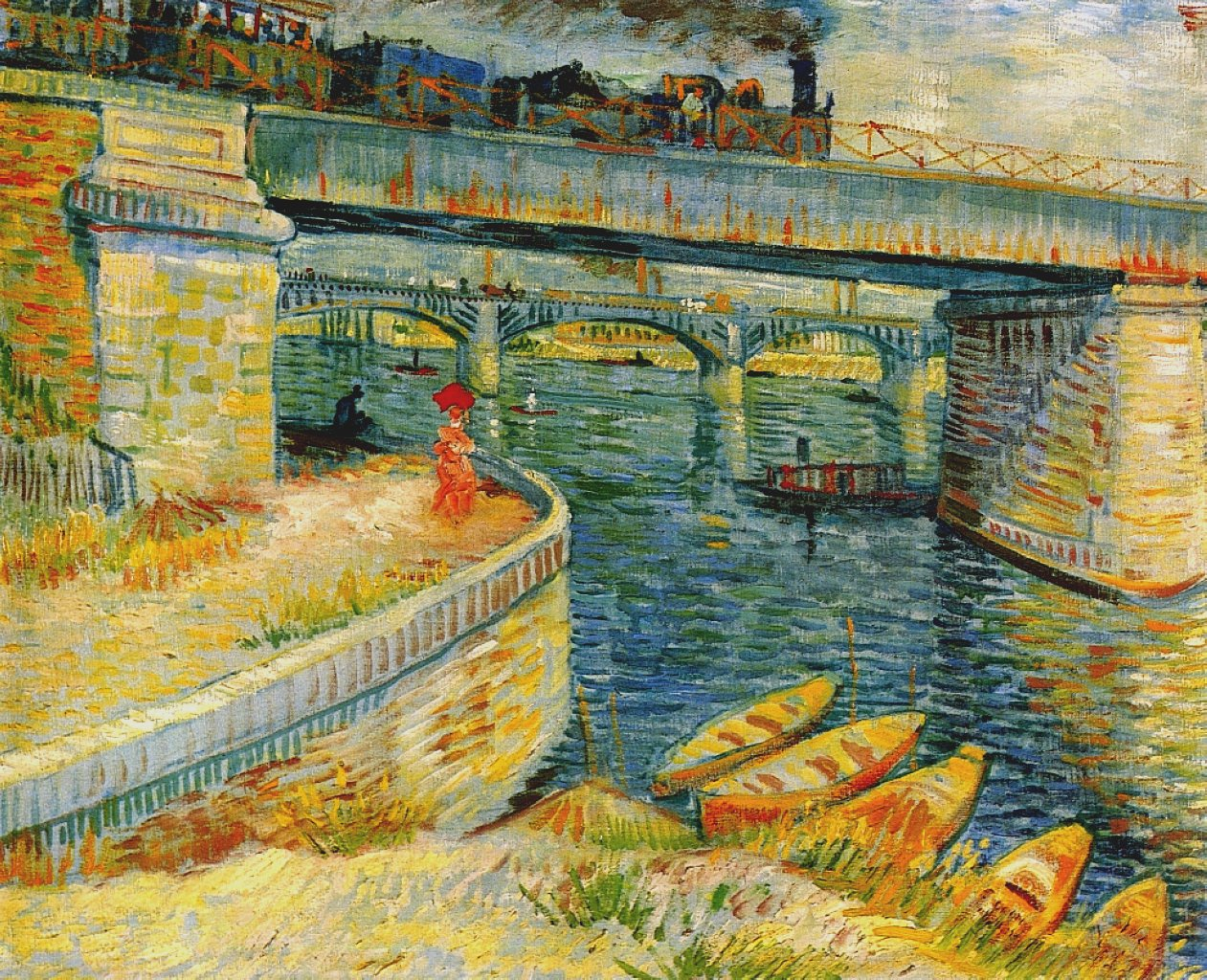
Vincent van Gogh, 1887, Bridges across the Seine at Asnieres, oil on canvas, 52 × 65 cm (20.5 × 25.6 in), Foundation E.G. Bührle, Zürich

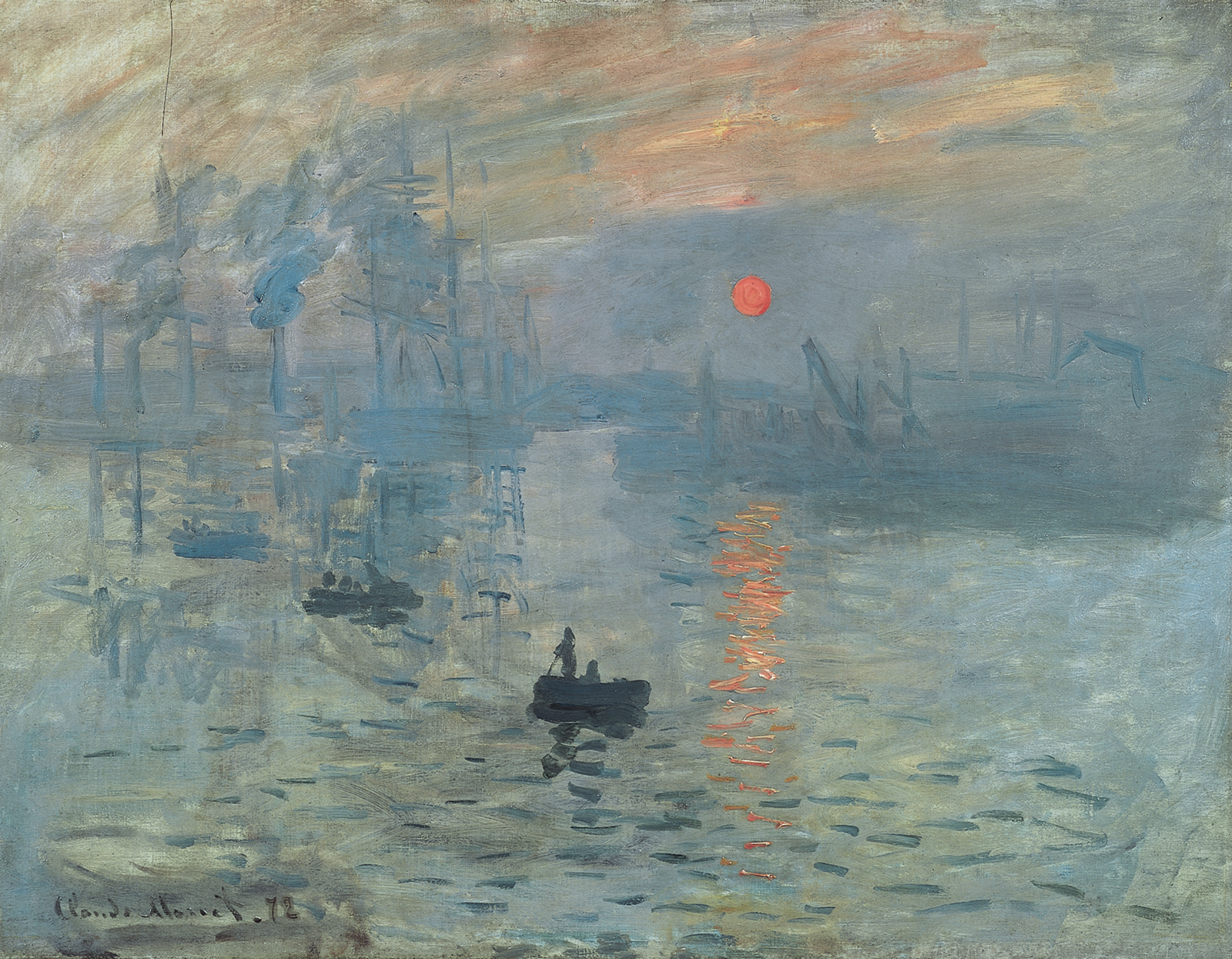
Claude Monet, 1872, Impression, soleil levant (Impression Sunrise), oil on canvas, 48 × 63 cm, Musée Marmottan Monet, Paris

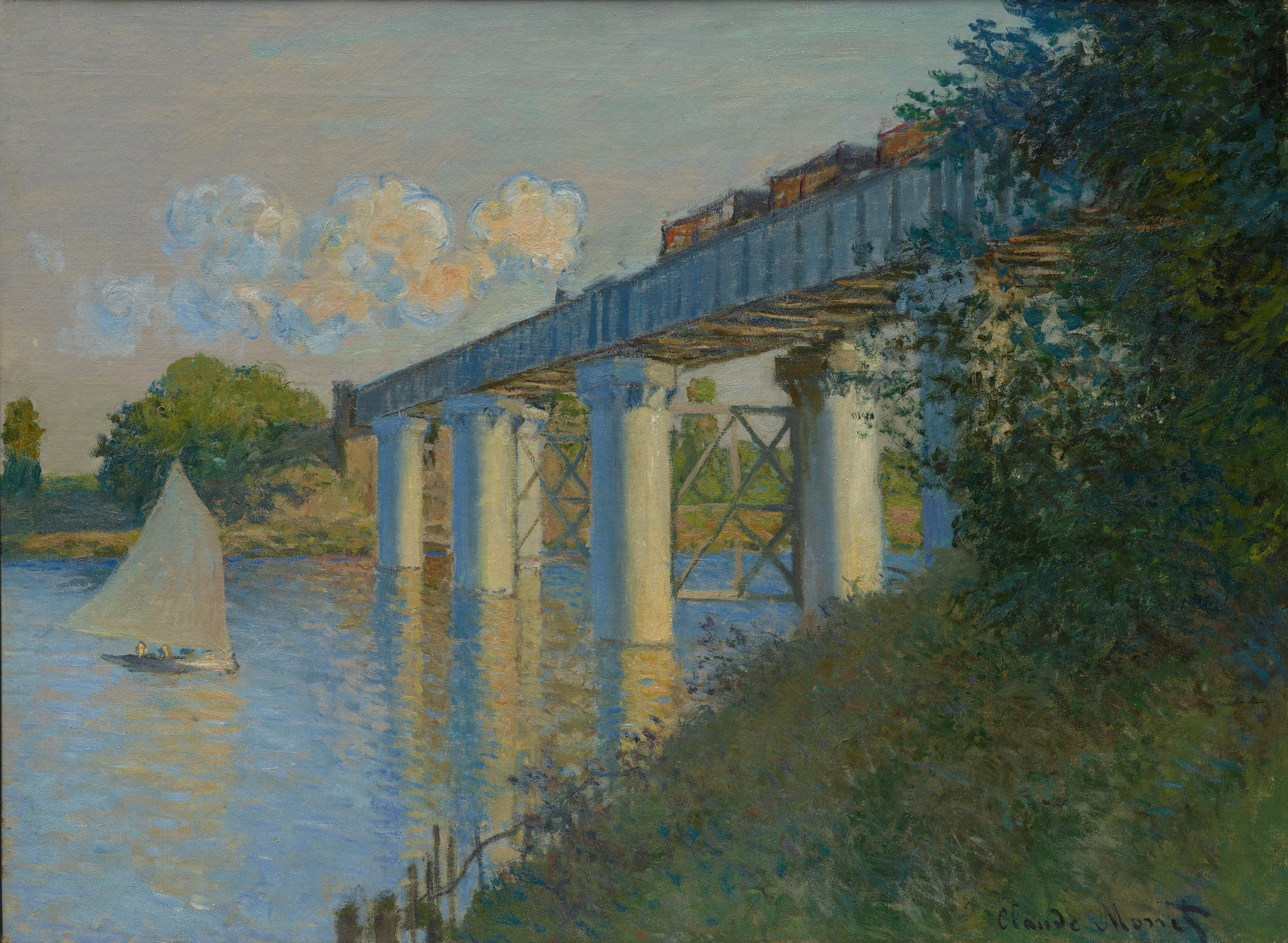
Claude Monet, 1873, The train bridge in Argenteuil (Le Pont du chemin de fer à Argenteuil), oil on canvas, 54.3 × 73.3 cm (21.4 × 28.9 in), Philadelphia Museum of Art

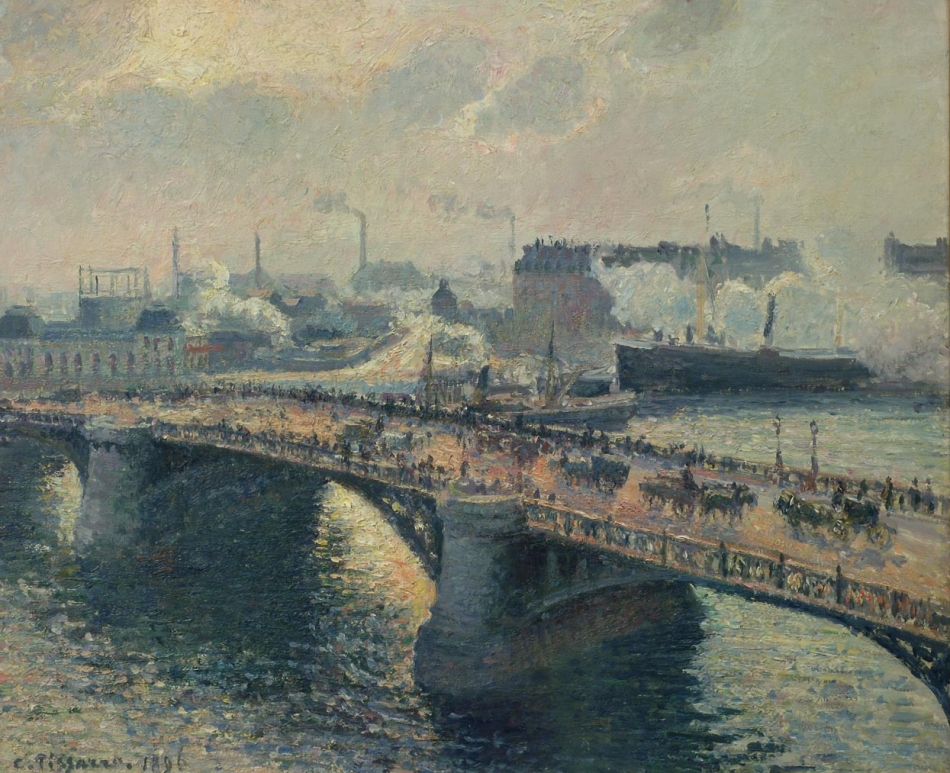
Camille Pissarro, 1896, Le Pont Boieldieu à Rouen, soleil couchant, temps brumeux, Musée des Beaux-Arts de Rouen

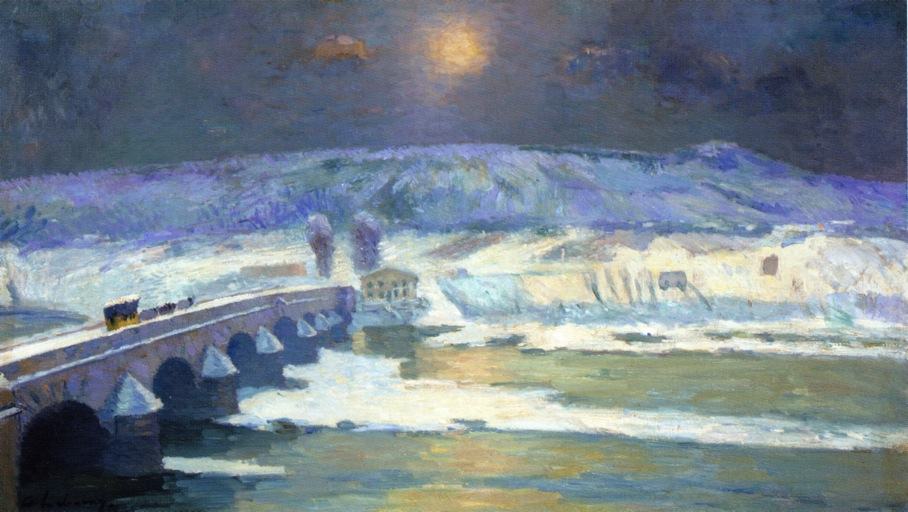
Albert Lebourg, 1886, The Bridge over the Allier at Pont-du-Chateau in Winter, oil on canvas, 43.6 x 77.7 cm, Private Collection

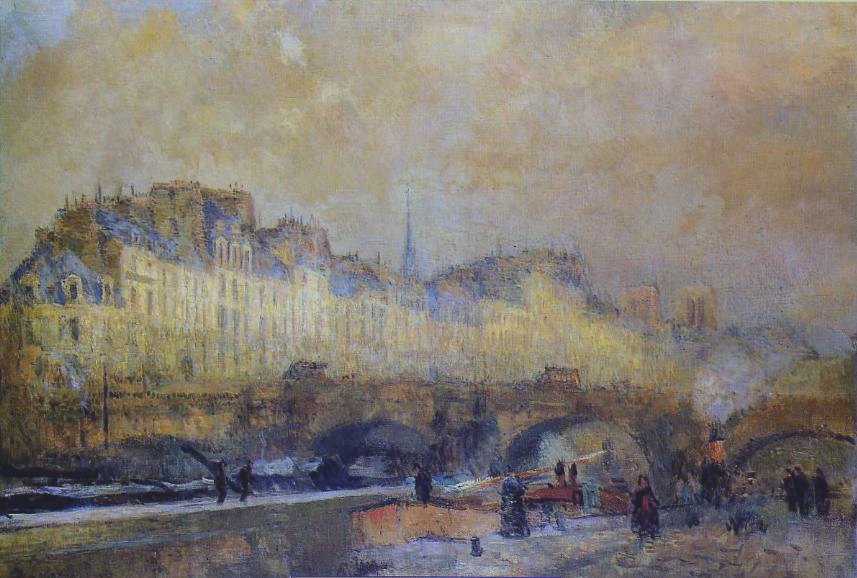
Albert Lebourg, before 1918, Paris, l'écluse de la Monnaie. Soleil d'hiver, oil on canvas, 81.5 x 115.5 cm, Musée d'Orsay, Paris
