= List of works by Robert Antoine Pinchon =

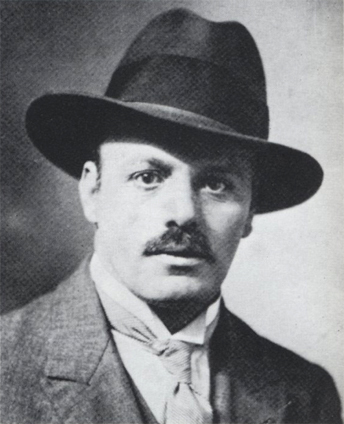
Robert Antoine Pinchon, photograph of the artist, circa 1925

This list of works by the French Post-Impressionist and Fauve painter of the l'École de Rouen (l'École de Rouen) Robert Antoine Pinchon is incomplete and consists mostly of oil paintings.

Pinchon was a prolific painter dedicated to painting en plein air. His artistic career spanned over forty years, from 1900 when he exhibited some of his first paintings at the age of 14, to his untimely death in 1943 at 56 years of age.

At the age of 19, Pinchon showed his works in Paris at the 1905 Salon d'Automne, an exhibition that witnessed the birth of Fauvism. Though Pinchon had not exhibited in room VII with the Fauves, his palette was already pure and his impasto thick.

Claude Monet referred to him as "a surprising touch in the service of a surprising eye ('étonnante patte au service d’un oeil surprenant')".

This list represents a selection of some of Robert Antoine Pinchon's better-known paintings, or includes those for which images are available. Rather than in chronological order, they are listed roughly in groups corresponding to themes: bridge scenes; flowers and gardens; harbors and boats; landscapes and fields; river scenes; towns; trees; winter scenes.

Image	Title	Year	Dimensions	Museum	Country
== Bridge scenes ==
	Triel sur Seine (Le pont du chemin de fer)	1904	46 x 55 cm	Private collection	
	La Seine à Rouen au crépuscule	1905-06	65 x 54 cm	Private collection	
	Le Pont aux Anglais	1905	38 x 46 cm	Private collection	
	Le Pont aux Anglais, soleil couchant	1905	54 x 73.2 cm	Musée des Beaux-Arts de Rouen	Rouen
	Le pont des Andelys, le long de la Seine		90 x 117 cm	Private collection	
	Le Pont aux Anglais	c.1905			
== Flowers and gardens ==
	L'escalier à Lescure	1907-10	73 x 60 cm	Private collection	
	Pots de géraniums	1915-20	72.8 x 91.5 cm	Private collection	
	La tonnelle sous la neige	1916	37.5 x 46.5 cm	Private collection	
	Le jardin aux pavots (The Garden of Papavers)	c.1906	73 x 92 cm	Private collection	
	Le bassin aux nymphéas	c.1910	65 x 81 cm	Private collection	
	Fleurs dans un vase	c.1912	43 x 56 cm	Private collection	
	Fleurs des champs	c.1915	105 x 171 cm	New York, U.S.	
	Le jardin aux iris	c.1920	80.9 x 116.2 cm	Private collection	New York, U.S.
	Le Baquet		81 x 100 cm	Private collection	
	Le jardin		130 x 97 cm	Private collection	
	Un après-midi à l'Ile aux Cerises	1912	50 x 61.2 cm	Private collection	
	Vases de fleurs sur le guéridon		60 x 73 cm	Private collection	
== Harbors and boats ==
	Le Pré-aux-Loups, soleil couchant	1904	50 x 73 cm	Private collection	
	Barques, Fécamp	1930	98 x 63 cm	Private collection	
	Le Pourquoi Pas du commandant Charcot dans le port de Rouen	1935	50 x 61 cm	Musée des Beaux-Arts de Rouen	Rouen
	Bateaux au port		46 x 55 cm	Private collection	
	Péniches dans la brume	Before 1909	54 x 73 cm	Musée des Beaux-Arts de Rouen	Rouen
	Péniches sur la Seine	c. 1910	73 x 92 cm	Private collection	New Jersey, US
	Le port de Fécamp		60 x 73 cm	Private collection	
	Vue du Tréport		65 x 81 cm	Private collection	
== Landscapes and fields ==
	Paysans au champs (Peasants in the Field)	1913	49 x 61 cm	Private collection	
	La vallée de Blainville-Crevon	1905	65 x 81 cm	Private collection	
	Peupliers, coteaux d'Eauplet	1908-09	31 x 49 cm	Private collection	Paris, France
	La Bouille (Restaurant champêtre de La Bouille)	1906	250 x 500 cm	L'Alhambra-Théâtre	Rouen
	Jardin en environs de Rouen	1912	73 x 92 cm	Private collection	New York, U.S.
	Le Talus de chemin de fer	1912	81 x 100 cm	Private collection	
	Le Jardin maraicher (The Market Garden)	c.1921	74 x 100 cm	Musée des Beaux-Arts de Rouen	Rouen
	Hameau des environs de Rouen	c.1905	22 x 33 cm	Private collection	
	Travaux des champs	c.1905	30.5 x 25 cm	Private collection	
	Le Vallon du temps perdu		73 x 92 cm	Philadelphia Museum of Art	
	Les chardons en bord de Seine (Chardons en fleurs)		65 x 81 cm	Private collection	
== Seine River scenes ==
	Broadway	1909-10	65.5 x 81 cm	Private collection	
	Les coteaux de Belbeuf	1909-10	60.5 x 73.5 cm	Private collection	
	Vue de l'Ile de Bréhat	1934	79 x 120 cm	Private collection	
	Bords de Seine (Seine river bank)		60 x 81 cm		
	Bords de Seine aux environ de Rouen			Private collection	
	La Seine pres de Rouen	c.1918	71 x 101 cm		
	Falaises de Belbeuf		50 x 61 cm	Private collection	
	Promenade sur le chemin de Halage		81 x 65 cm	Private collection	
	Rouen, La Seine, vue depuis le hauteurs de Caudebec		73.7 x 92.4 cm	Private collection	
	Rouen, vue de la Seine		48.9 x 92.4 cm		
== Town scenes ==
	Les toits rouges	1903	54.3 x 73 cm	Private collection	New York, U.S.
	La foire Saint-Romain sur la place Saint-Vivien, Rouen	1905-06	49 x 59.4 cm	Paris, France	
	La Côte Sainte-Catherine	1917	91 x 49 cm	Private collection	
	Le marché de Pont Audemer		53 x 71 cm		
	Paysage		72.5 x 92 cm	Private collection	
	Usines à Eauplet (Factories at Eauplet)		73 x 92 cm	Private collection	
	Vue sur Rouen		54 x 71 cm		
== Trees ==
	L'avenue Saint-Paul et la Côte Sainte-Catherine, Rouen	1906	60 x 76 cm	Private collection	
	Le Toquesac, Aout	1912	64.7 x 81.2 cm	Private collection	
	Vue prise au Mont-Gargan soleil couchant	Before 1909	65 x 81 cm	Musée des Beaux-Arts de Rouen	Rouen
	Sous bois d'automne		60 x 73 cm	Private collection	
== Winter scenes ==
	Paysage d'hiver (Le chemin, neige)	1905	60 x 73 cm	Private collection	
	Environs de Rouen sous la neige		50 x 73 cm		
	L'île Lacroix en hiver (Island of Lacroix in winter)		23.5 x 42 cm		
	La Bouille sous la Neige		90 x 50 cm	Private collection	
	La Seine et la Côte Sainte Catherine à Rouen en hiver	1930-35	54.6 x 83.2 cm		
	Le bassin, neige		50 x 60 cm	Private collection	
	Le Chemin des Bulins	1924-1925	50 x 65 cm	Private collection	
	Le pont d'Elbeuf sous la neige		54 x 92 cm	Private collection	
	Le ponton		54 x 73 cm		
	Le Robec sous la neige aux alentours de Rouen		65 x 101 cm	Private collection	
	Neige		73 x 92 cm		
	Village enneigé (Snowy Village)		73 x 92 cm	Private collection	
== Various works ==
	Le Chemin (The Path)	1898	22 x 32 cm		
	Haystacks (Hay stalks)	1898	57 x 90 cm	Private collection	
	Fenaisons sous les pommiers, Saint-Étienne-du-Rouvray	1905	54.2 x 73.3 cm		
	Effet de neige	Before 1909	73 x 92 cm	Musée des Beaux-Arts de Rouen	Rouen
	La Seine vue d'Elbeuf	1932-1934	75.5 x 124.5 cm	Private collection	
	Le Pont de chemin de fer près de Rouen	1908	73.4 x 85.7 cm	Private collection	
	La Rue de l'Epicerie à Rouen	1912	192 x 150 cm		
	La ferme de Guerischein	1916	34.5 x 45.7 cm	Private collection	
	La Barrière	1932-1934	55 x 65 cm	Private collection	
	Le port et le pont transbordeur		60 x 81 cm	Musée des Beaux-Arts de Rouen	Rouen
	Le Mont-Gargan sous la Neige	1924	73 x 54 cm	Private collection	
	Les grande ventes	1924	81 x 66 cm	Private collection	
	La Cathédrale de Rouen	1931	100 x 81 cm	Private collection	
	La Manneporte, Étretat	1936	81 x 65 cm	Private collection	
	La Seine à La Bouille	1936	54 x 81 cm	Private collection	
	Port de Saint-Tropez	1936	59.3 x 73.4 cm		
	A l'île aux cerises		50 x 61.2 cm	Private collection	
	Bord de Seine près de Rouen		54 x 73 cm	Private collection	
	Le pont Corneille	c.1910	73 x 100 cm		
	Effects of the Sun on the Rocks of Brittany		66 x 81 cm	Private collection	
	Hommage posthume à un bon vivant		61 x 66 cm	Private collection	
	La côte d'albâtre à Pourville		50 x 66 cm		
	La Seine à Croisset			Private collection	
	La Seine aux environ de Rouen		73 x 100 cm	Private collection	
	Le champ de choux		81 x 100 cm	Private collection	
	Les roches de Saint-Adrien au soleil couchant		73 x 100.5 cm	Private collection	
	Petit voilier à l'appontement en bord de Seine		61 x 81 cm	Private collection	
	Porch of the Abbey of St. Ouen		81 x 66 cm		
	Promenade en bord de Seine au soleil couchant		60 x 81 cm	Paris	
	Les usines Malétra				
