= Albert Malet (painter) =

French painter

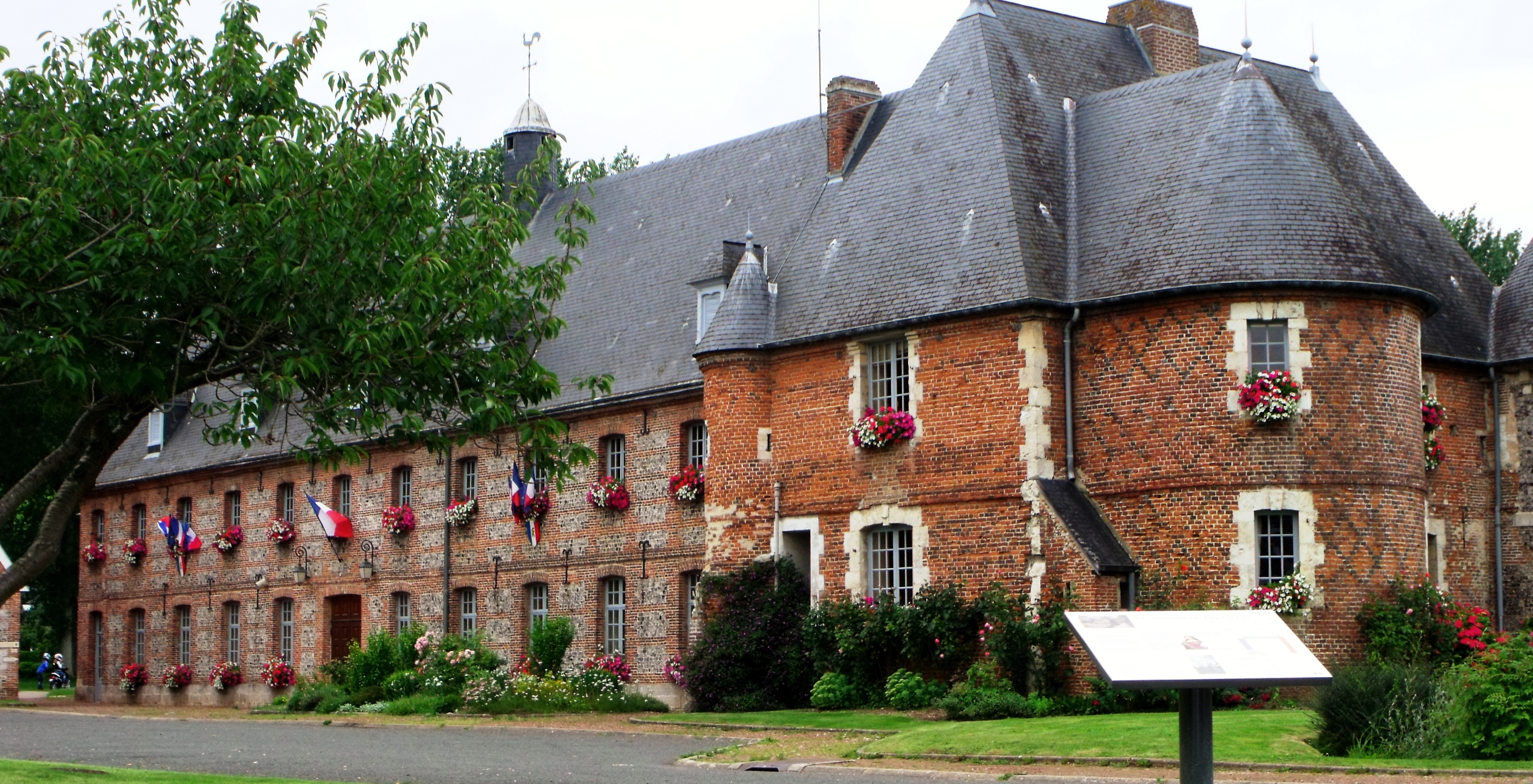
Briançon Manor in Criel-sur-Mer

Albert Malet (1912 – 9 September 1986) was a French painter of the Rouen school.

Malet was born at Bosc-le-Hard. A retrospective of his work was held at the hôtel de Bourgtheroulde at Rouen in 2006.

== Honours and awards ==
- Chevalier of the Ordre des Palmes Académiques

== Bibliography ==
- François Lespinasse, L'École de Rouen, Fernandez, Sotteville-lès-Rouen, 1980
- François Lespinasse, L'École de Rouen, Lecerf, Rouen, 1995 ISBN 2-901342-04-3
