= Albert Lebourg =

French painter (1849–1928)

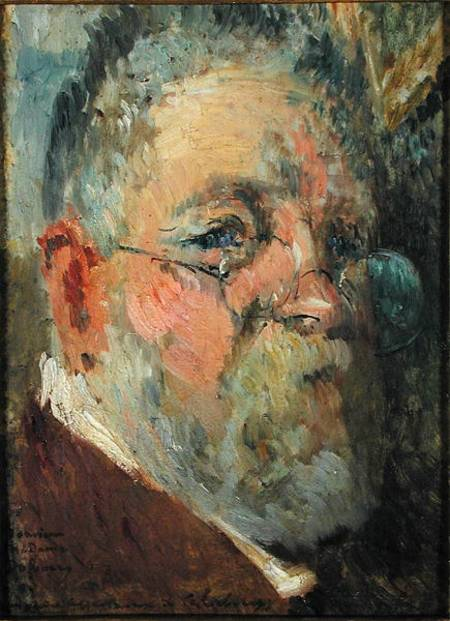
- Albert Lebourg, Self Portrait
- Born: Albert Marie Lebourg; 1 February 1849; Montfort-sur-Risle, France
- Died: 6 January 1928 (aged 78); Rouen, France
- Education: École des Beaux-Arts de Rouen
- Known for: Painting
- Movement: Impressionism, Post-Impressionism, Rouen School
- Awards: Officer of the Legion of Honour

Albert Lebourg (1 February 1849, in Montfort-sur-Risle – 6 January 1928, in Rouen), birth name Albert-Marie Lebourg, also called Albert-Charles Lebourg and Charles Albert Lebourg, was a French Impressionist and Post-Impressionist landscape painter of the Rouen School (l'École de Rouen). Member of the Société des Artistes Français, he actively worked in a luminous Impressionist style, creating more than 2,000 landscapes during his lifetime. The artist was represented by Galerie Mancini in Paris in 1896, in 1899 and 1910 by : Galerie Bernheim-Jeune, 1903 and 1906 at the Galerie Paul Rosenberg, and 1918 and 1923 at Galerie Georges Petit.

== Early life ==
Initially studying at Évreux Lycée, Albert Lebourg, with interests in architecture, entered the École des Beaux-Arts of Rouen at a very young age. He studied art with Gustave Morin at l'Academie de peinture et de dessins, Rouen. Afterward, he was briefly a student of Jean-Paul Laurens. In 1876, Lebourg exhibited his works for the first time together with Claude Monet, Alfred Sisley, Pierre-Auguste Renoir, and other artists on the Boulevard Montmartre. Lebourg was referred to be appointed as a drawing professor at the Société des Beaux-Arts in Algiers after being noticed in Rouen by the art collector Laurent Laperlier. There he met Jean Seignemartin, who he inspired to bring more clarity and light into his paintings. In 1873 Lebourg married and remained in Algiers until the summer of 1877 when he resigned from his teaching position and returned to Paris with numerous paintings of the casbah, mosques and the Admiralty.

== Career ==
In the Fourth Impressionist Exhibition of 1879 Lebourg exhibited 30 works with Claude Monet, Camille Pissarro and Edgar Degas, presenting paintings and drawings executed in Algiers. In the Fifth Impressionist Exhibition or 1880 he exhibited 20 works depicting Rouen, Paris and Algiers. In 1883 he was admitted to the Salon (Paris) with his work entitled Matinée à Dieppe. In 1887 he exhibited at the acclaimed Les XX exhibition, with Walter Sickert, Camille Pissarro, Berthe Morisot and Georges-Pierre Seurat exhibit, with Seurat and Signac present at the opening. The major work shown is Seurat's A Sunday Afternoon on the Island of La Grande Jatte.

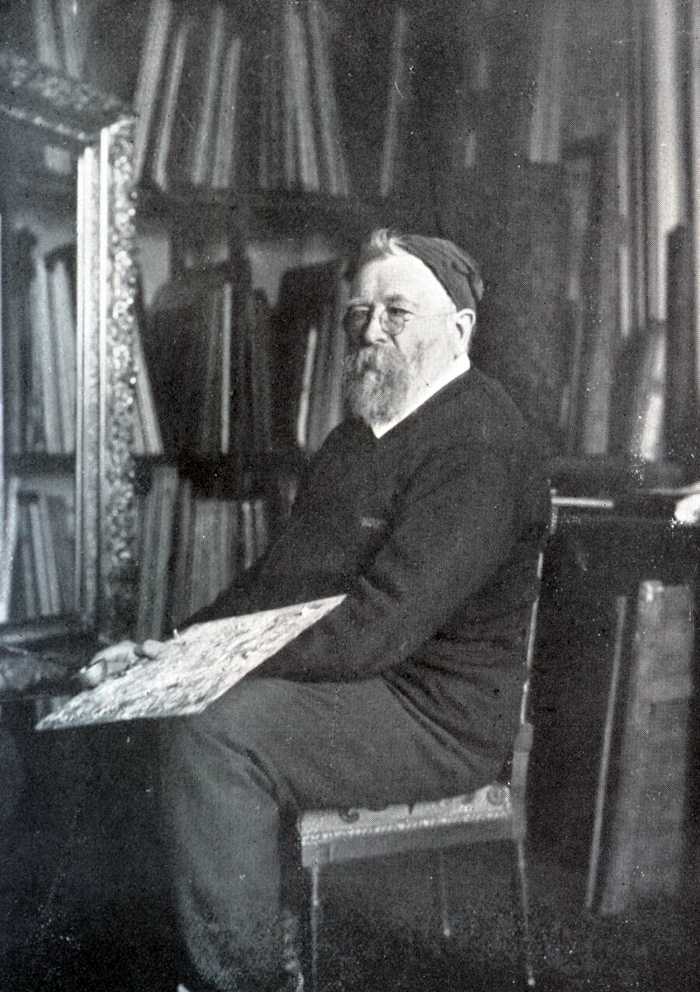
Albert Lebourg, from, Exposition Albert Lebourg au profit des sinistrés du Japon, 1923

Lebourg remained occupied in all four seasons painting animated scenes of the Seine in and near Rouen and Paris. He energetically painted in Auvergne, Normandy and Île-de-France, finally settling in Puteaux where he remained from 1888 to 1895, availing himself to the surroundings of Paris, painting what he would regard as his best works. He wrote at the time:

"I will paint often at the banks of the Seine: Nanterre, Rueil, Chatou, Bougival, Port-Marly. These are a source of themes and very beautiful landscapes". (Lebourg)

He became a member of the Société des Artistes Français beginning in 1893.

Lebourg moved to the Netherlands in 1895, where he would stay two years. He exhibited to great acclaim at the Mancini Gallery in Paris and won the silver medal at the Exposition Universelle (1900). In 1903 a retrospective exhibition was organized presenting 111 works at the Gallerie Rosenberg, the art gallery of Paul Rosenberg at 21 rue de la Boétie in Paris. While his fame was firmly established by 1910 he continued exhibiting annually at the Salon. In 1918 another retrospective was organized in Paris.

At the home of Impressionist art collector François Depeaux (1853–1920), Lebourg had the opportunity to converse many times with Camille Pissarro, Claude Monet, and Robert Antoine Pinchon (an artist who greatly admired him).

13 November 1909, the Musée des Beaux-Arts de Rouen opened a show with fifty-two paintings: thirteen by Lebourg, three by Monet, nine by Sisley, one by Renoir, three by Armand Guillaumin, five by Joseph Delattre, two by Charles Frechon and four by Robert Antoine Pinchon. And in 1918, in the same museum, Lebourg was represented along with Bonnard, Boudin, Camoin, Cross, Guillaumin, Luce, Matisse, Monet, Signac and Vuillard and Pinchon.

He suffered a stroke in September 1920 that paralyzed the left side of his body. He nevertheless remarried in February 1921. A Catalogue Raisonné was organized that year that included 2,137 works and was released in 1923, which garnered united praise by the press.

He was named Chevalier of the Legion of Honour on 27 June 1903, and breveted Officer of the Legion of Honour 22 April 1924

Albert Lebourg died in Rouen on 7 January 1928. Lebourg's works are exhibited at the Musée d’Orsay, Petit-Palais and Carnavalet in Paris, as well as museums in Bayonne, Clermont-Ferrand, Le Havre, Dunkerque, Lille, Strasbourg, Sceaux and above all Rouen at the Musée des Beaux-Arts de Rouen (François Depeaux collection).

== Selected works ==
- Lebourg, Le quai de la Tournelle et Notre-Dame de Paris, 1909, Musée Marmottan Monet, Paris
- View of Pont-du-Château, 1885, Hermitage Museum, Saint Saint Petersburg
- Remorqueurs à Rouen, Musée d'Orsay, Paris
- L'Île Lacroix sous la neige, Musée des Beaux-Arts de Rouen
- Navire norvégien dans le port de Rouen, Musée des Beaux-Arts de Rouen
- La Seine à Rouen, Musée des Beaux-Arts de Lyon
- La Seine à Croisset, Musée de la Chartreuse de Douai
- Faure Museum (Aix-les-Bains), Savoie
- Neige à Pont-du-Château, 1885, Musée d'art Roger-Quilliot, Clermont-Ferrand
- Neige à Pont-du-Château, Au Musée d'Évreux (Dépôt du Musée du Louvre), 1983, (inv. R.F. 1973-6).
- Vue de la Seine au bas Meudon, 1893, Musée de l'Île-de-France, Sceaux, Hauts-de-Seine
- Le pont de Neuilly du côté de Courbevoie, Musée de l'Île-de-France, Sceaux, Hauts-de-Seine
- The Seine at La Bouille, ca.1904-10, National Museum of Western Art, Tokyo
- La Seine près de Saint-Cloud, North Carolina Museum of Art
- Le Port d'Anvers (The Harbor at Anvers), 1895–1897, Phoenix Art Museum
- La Rue de Bouchers à Algers, 1873, Ger Eenens Collection the Netherlands

== Gallery ==
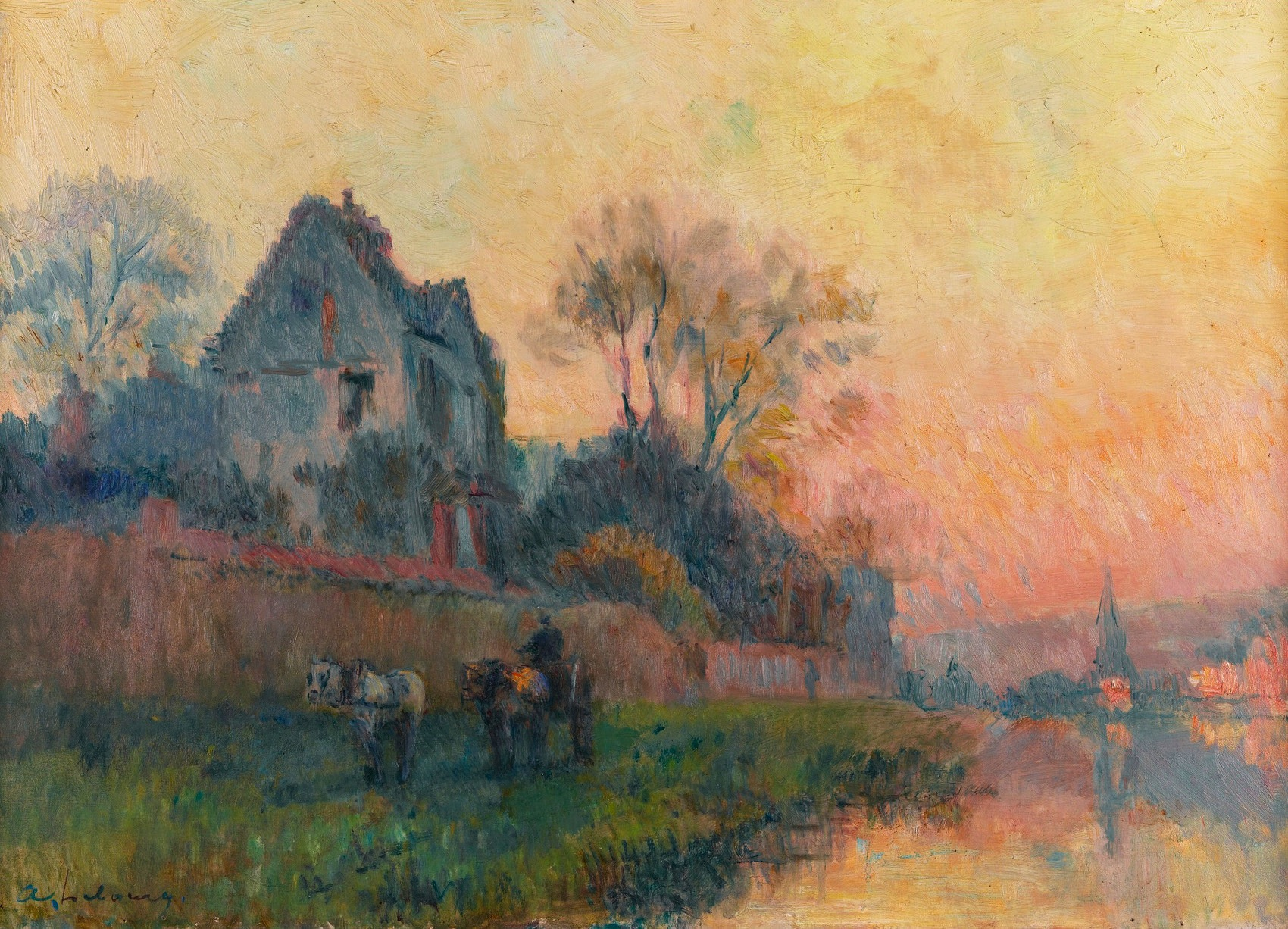
Bords de Seine à Chatou, oil on canvas, 46.4 by 65.1 cm (18.25 by 25.6 in)

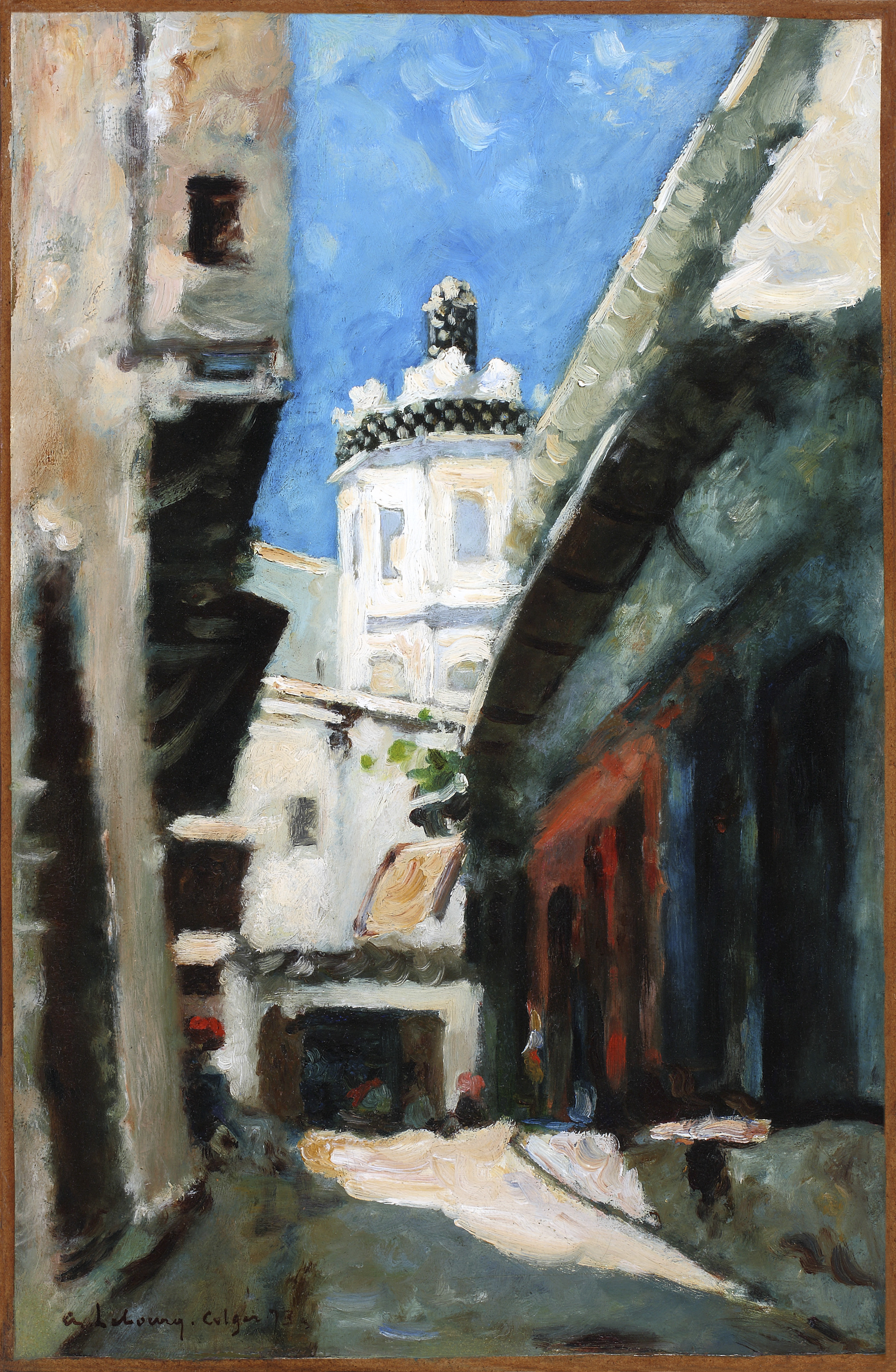
La Rue de Bouchers à Algers, 1873, Ger Eenens Collection the Netherlands

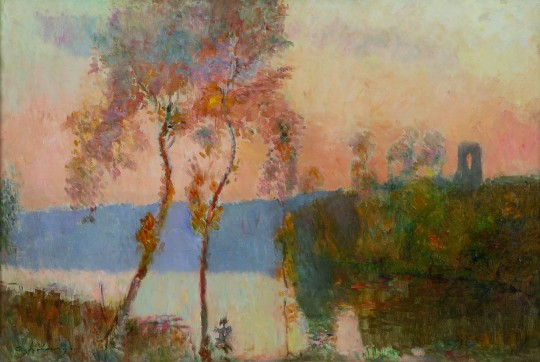
Chalou Moulineux, 1910

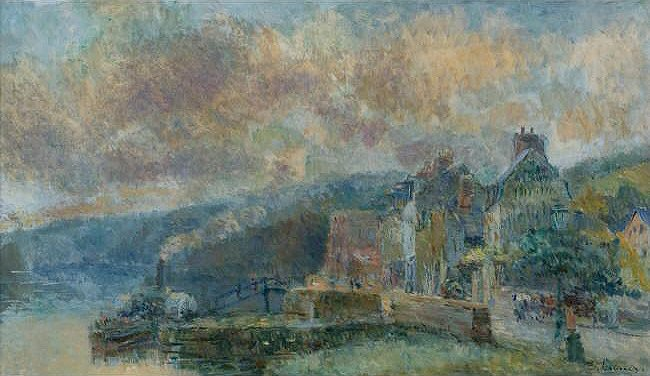
Bateau à vapeur à Croisset, 60.9 × 103.5 cm (24 × 40.7 in)

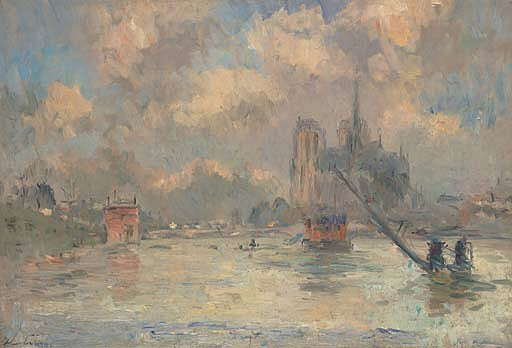
Notre-Dame de Paris et la Seine pendant l'inondation de 1910, 50.8 × 73.8 cm (20 × 29.1 in)

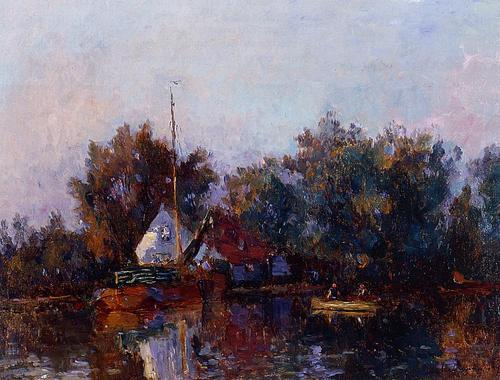
Canal in Holland near Rotterdam, ca.1890

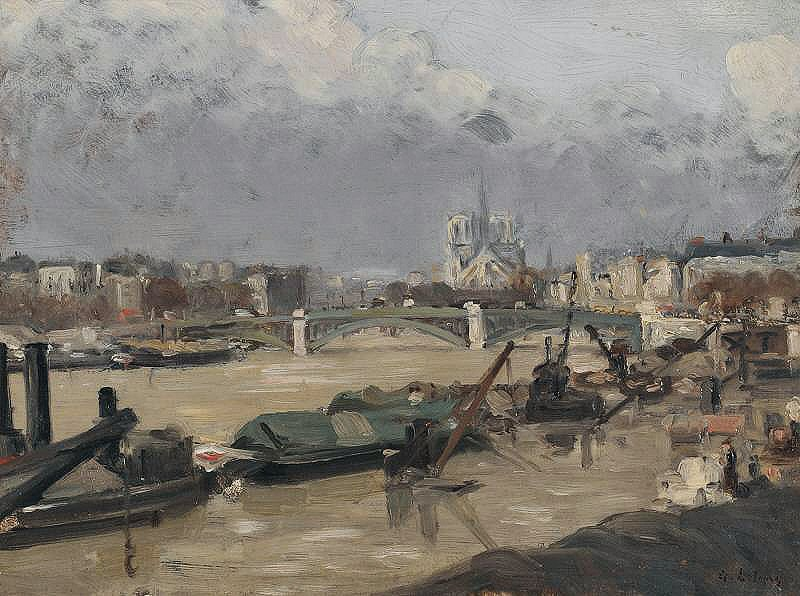
Le Chevet de Notre-Dame, ca.1900, 25 × 34 cm (9.8 × 13.4 in)

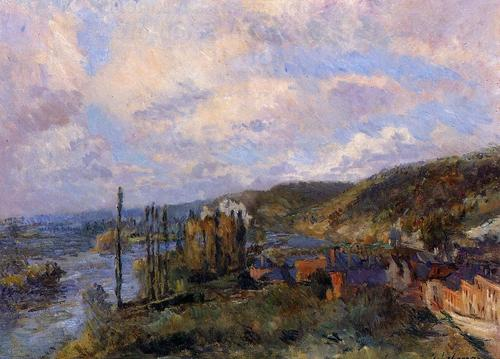
Near Rouen, The Cliffs of Saint Adrien, ca.1890

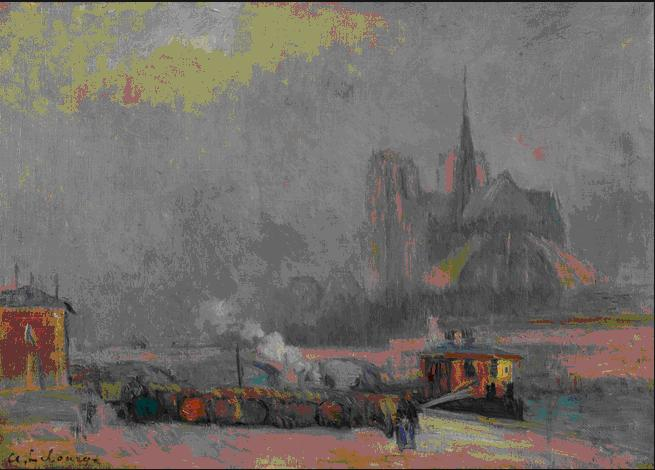
Notre Dame de Paris, View from the Quay de Tournelle, ca.1895

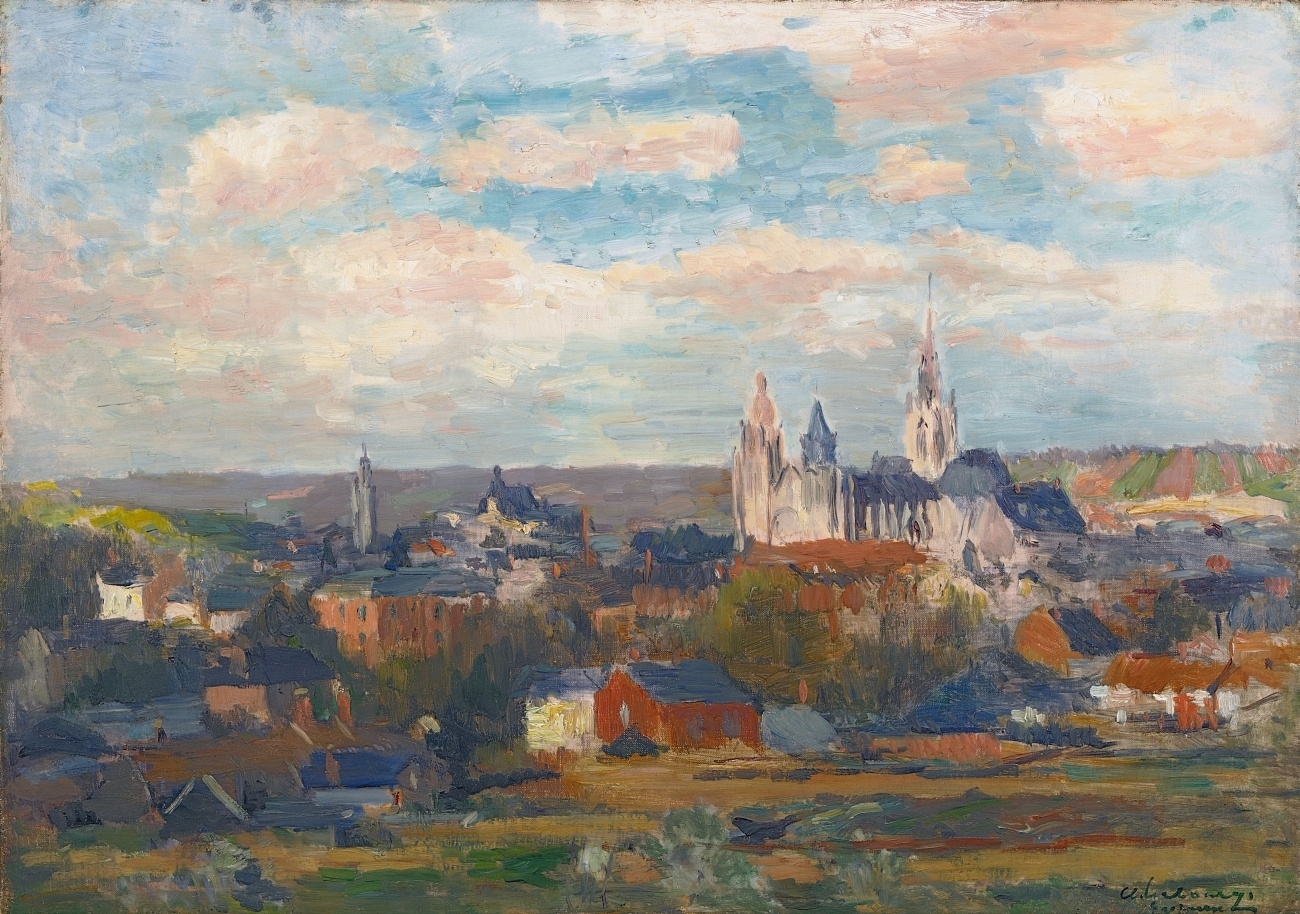
Vue d'Évreux avec la cathédrale Notre Dame, ca.1897, 46 × 65 cm (18.1 × 25.6 in)

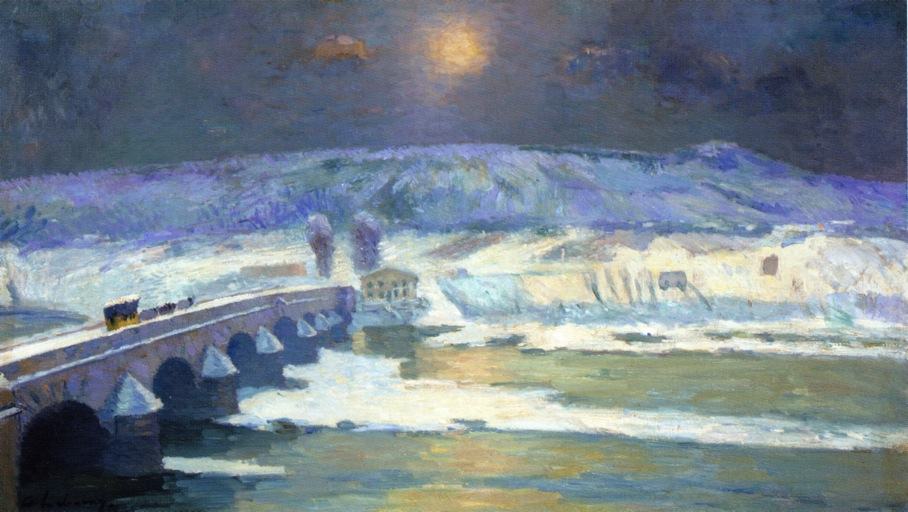
The Bridge over the Allier at Pont-du-Chateau in Winter, 1886, 43.6 x 77.7 cm

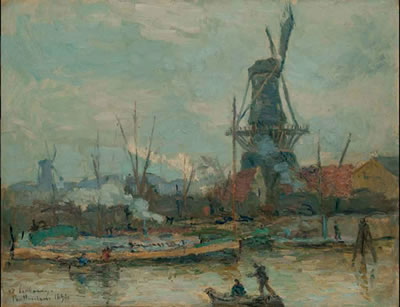
Les anciens moulins du port de rotterdam un jour de grand vent, ca.1890

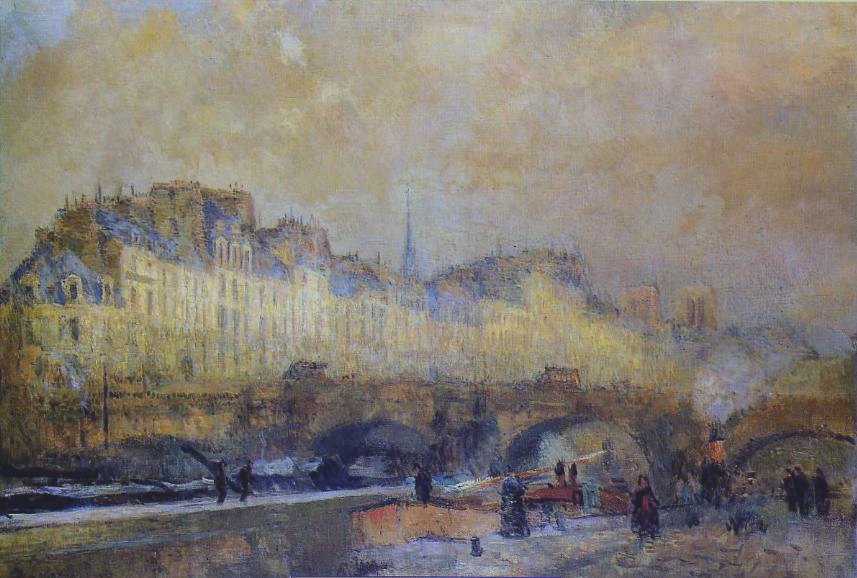
Paris, l'écluse de la Monnaie. Soleil d'hiver, before 1918, 81.5 x 115.5 cm, Musée d'Orsay, Paris

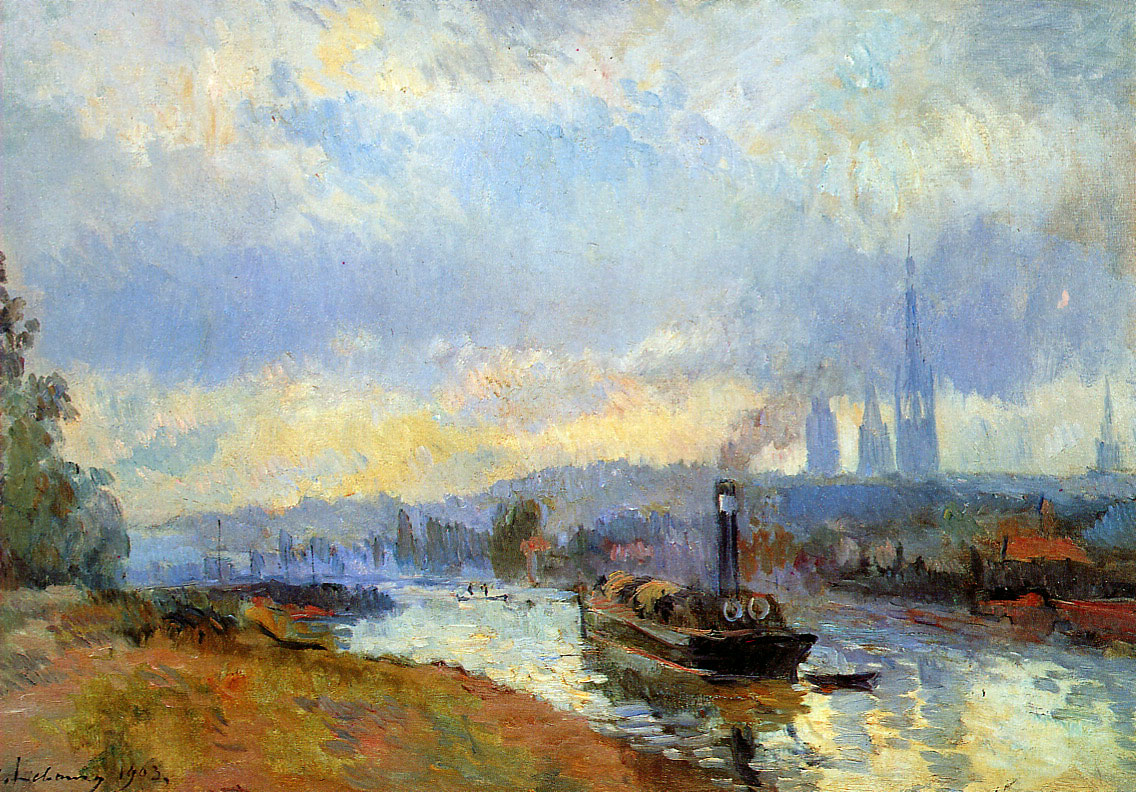
Tow boats in Rouen Sun ca.1900

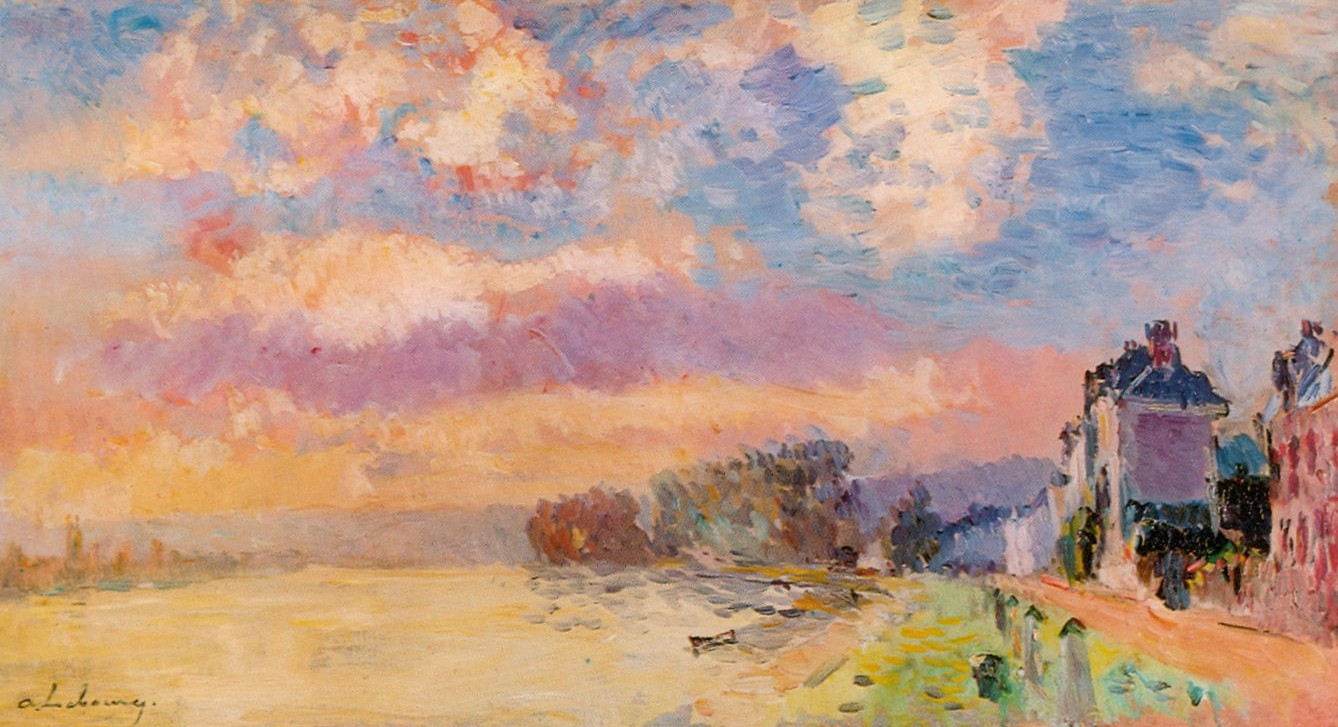
La Seine à Dieppedalle, environs de Rouen, ca.1900

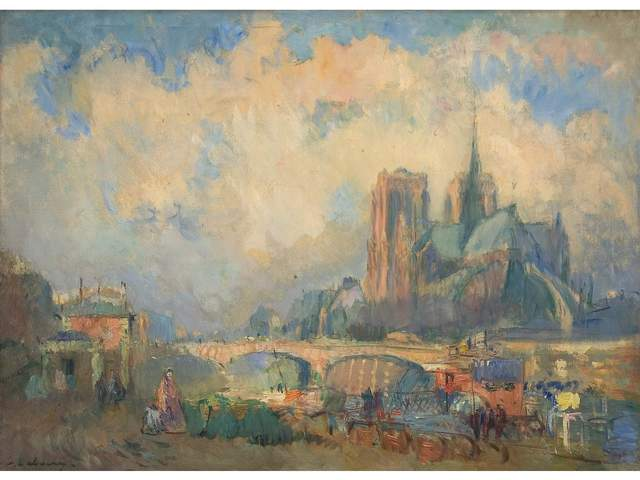
Paris, le pont de l’Archevêché et Notre-Dame vus du Quai de la Tournelle, ca.1890

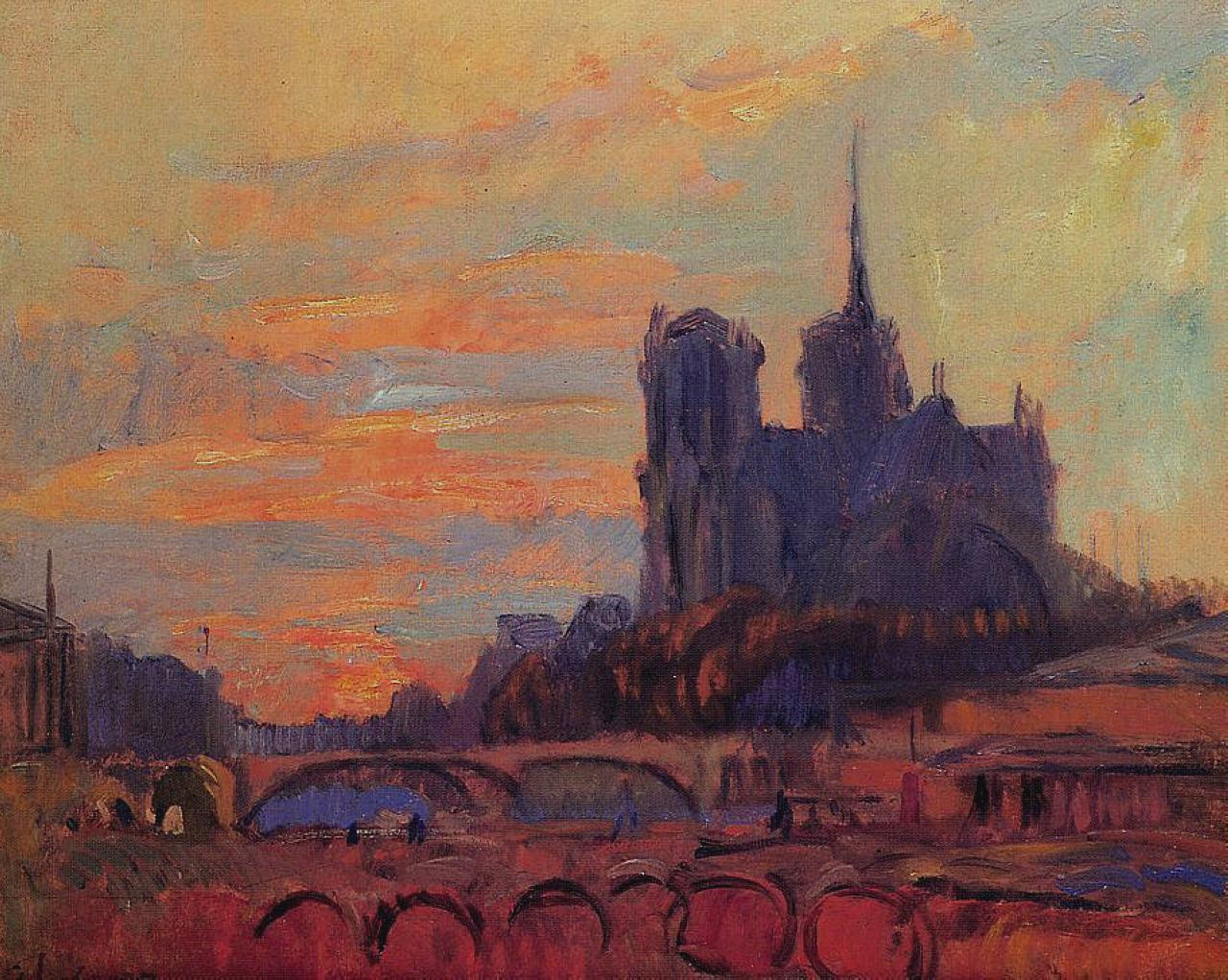
Notre Dame de Paris et La Seine, ca.1895

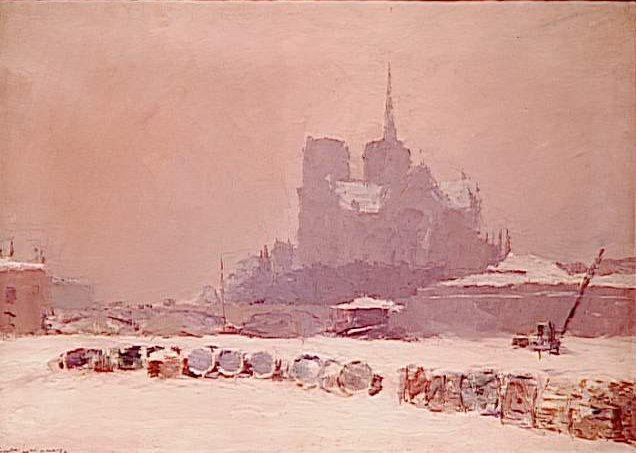
La Notre Dame, neige, ca.1895

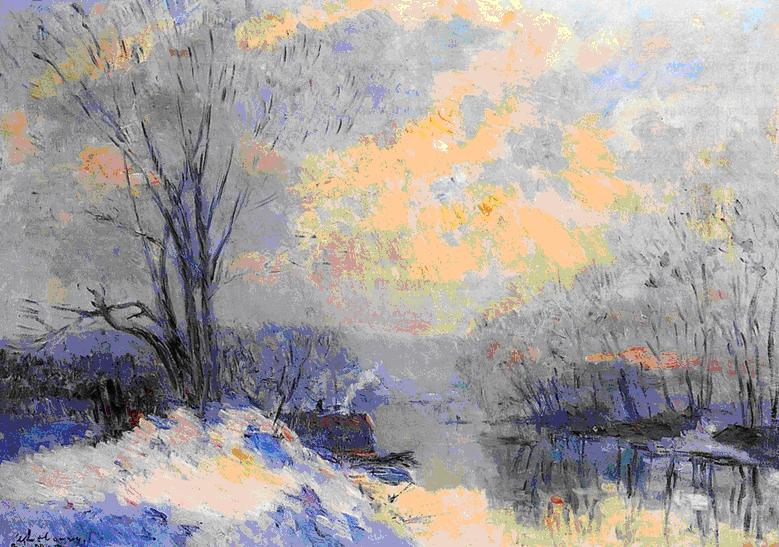
The small branche of the Seine at Bas Meudon, Snow and Sunlight, ca.1890

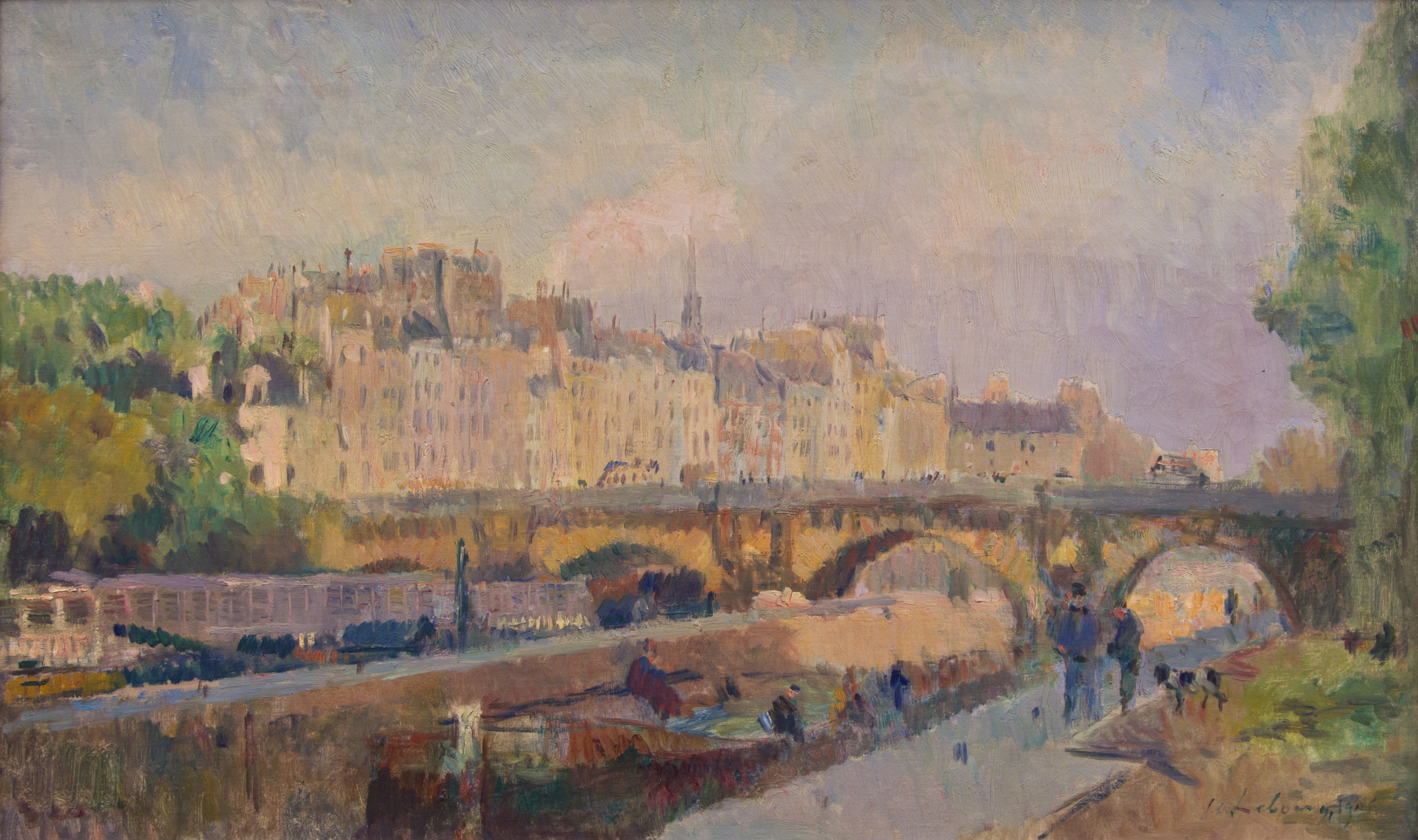
Paris, le pont Neuf, 1906, Petit Palais, Paris
