= Rouen School =

Group of painters active in Rouen in the 19th and early 20th centuries

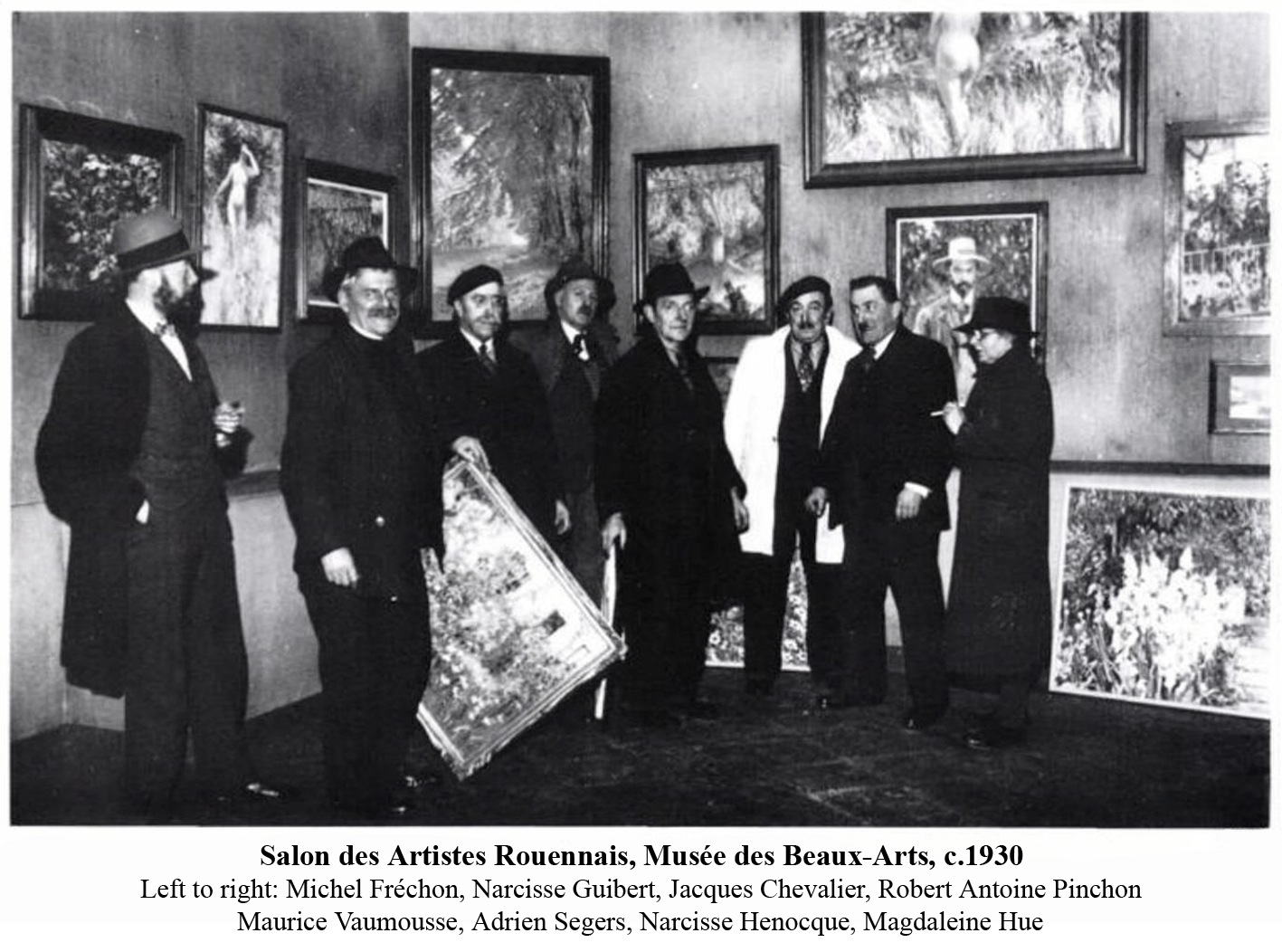
Salon des Artistes Rouennais, Musée des Beaux-Arts de Rouen, c.1930

The Rouen School (L'École de Rouen) is a term used for artists or artisans born or working in Rouen, or for all artistic products from Rouen, such as Rouen faience of the 16th to 18th centuries.

The term was first used in 1902 by Arsène Alexandre in his catalogue to an exhibition by Joseph Delattre in the galerie Durand-Ruel in Paris. Alexandre used it to refer to Joseph Delattre, Léon-Jules Lemaître, Charles Angrand and Charles Frechon, four Post-Impressionist artists interested in Neo-Impressionism (and particularly Seurat's pointillism) towards the end of the 1880s. Alexandre also used the term for a second generation of l'École de Rouen, including Robert Antoine Pinchon and Pierre Dumont among others, in relation to Fauvism and Cubism.

== Works ==
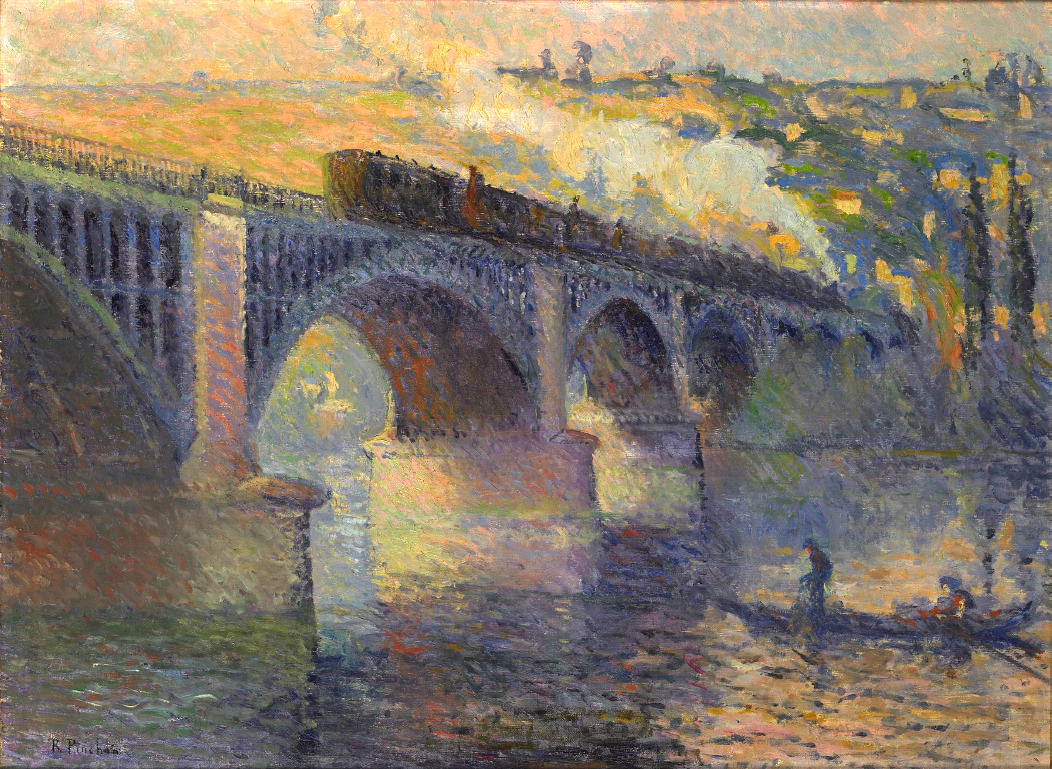
Robert Antoine Pinchon, Le Pont aux Anglais, soleil couchant (1905) Musée des Beaux-Arts de Rouen

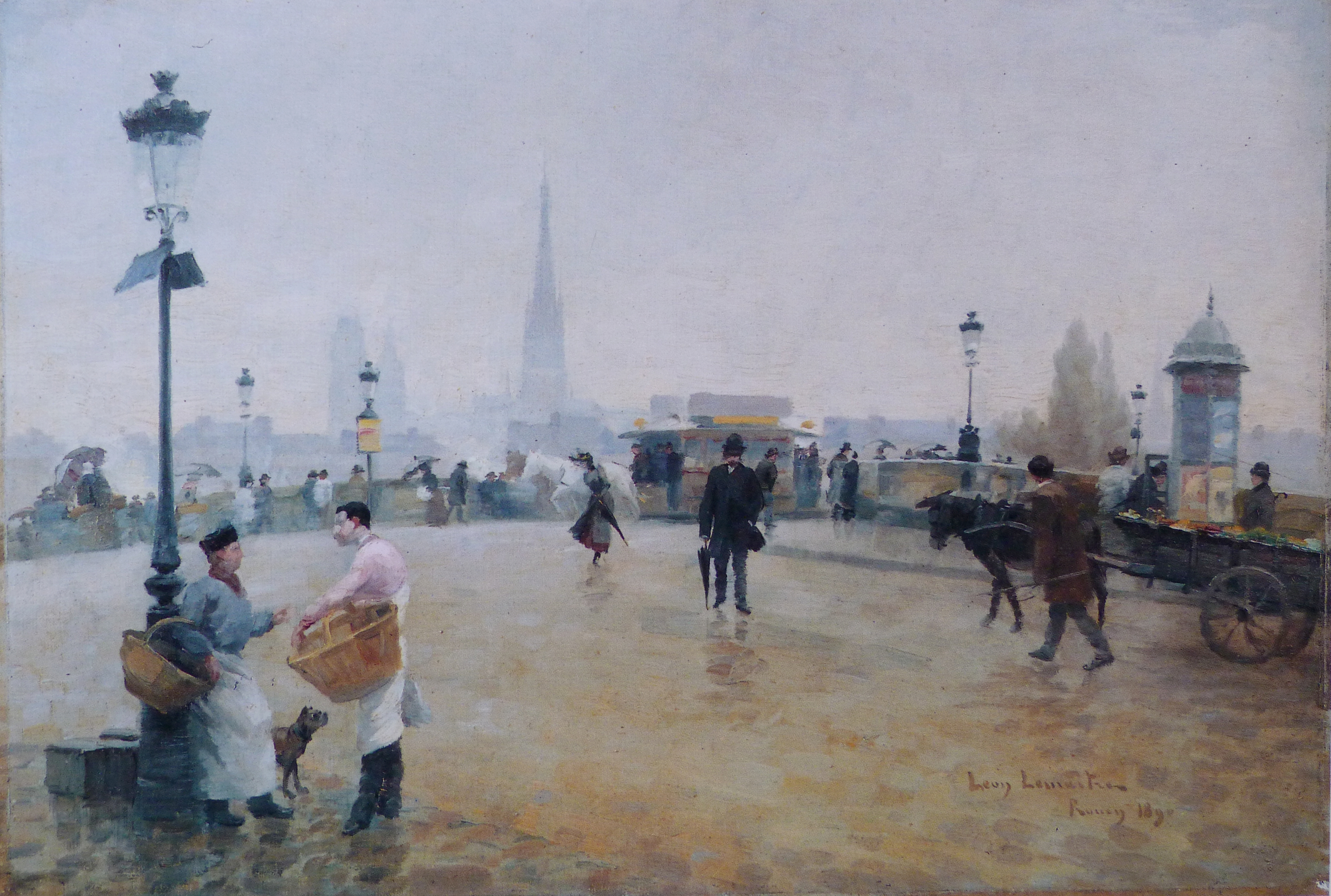
Léon-Jules Lemaître, Le Pont Corneille, Rouen, 1890

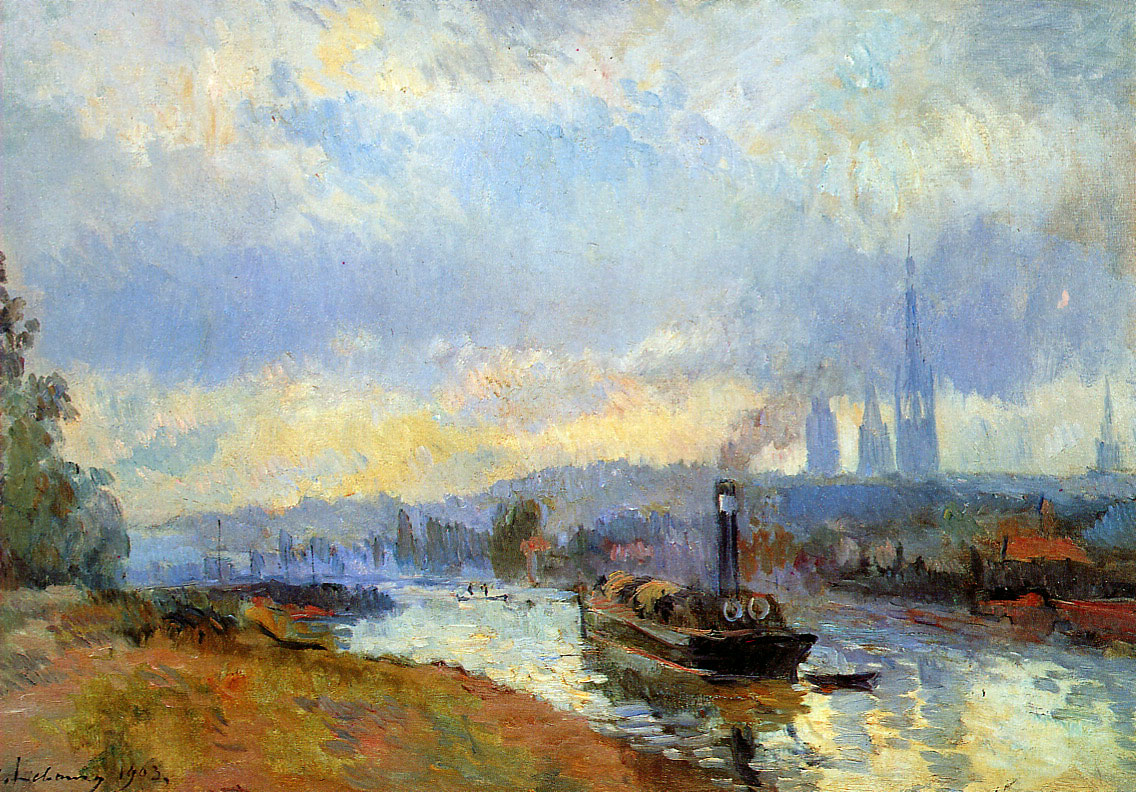
Albert Lebourg, Tow boats in Rouen Sun, 1900

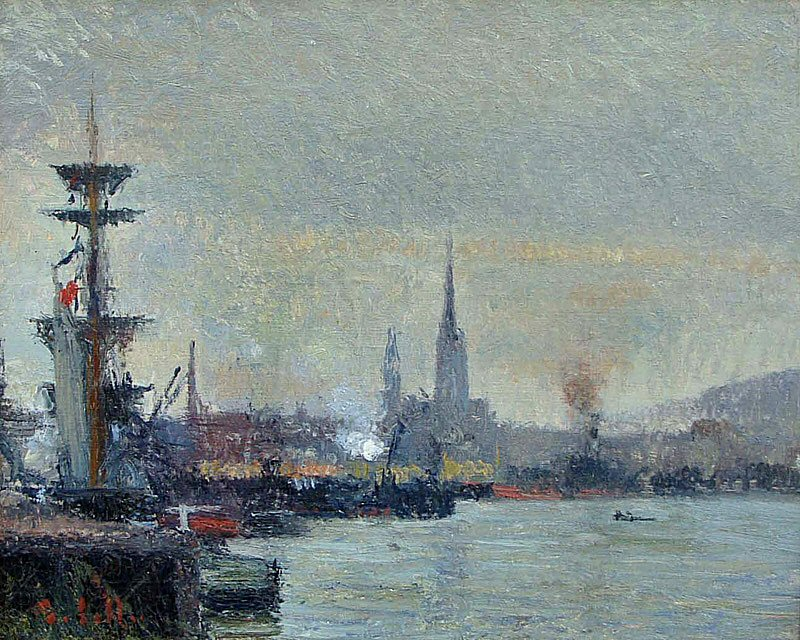
Joseph Delattre, Le Port de Rouen

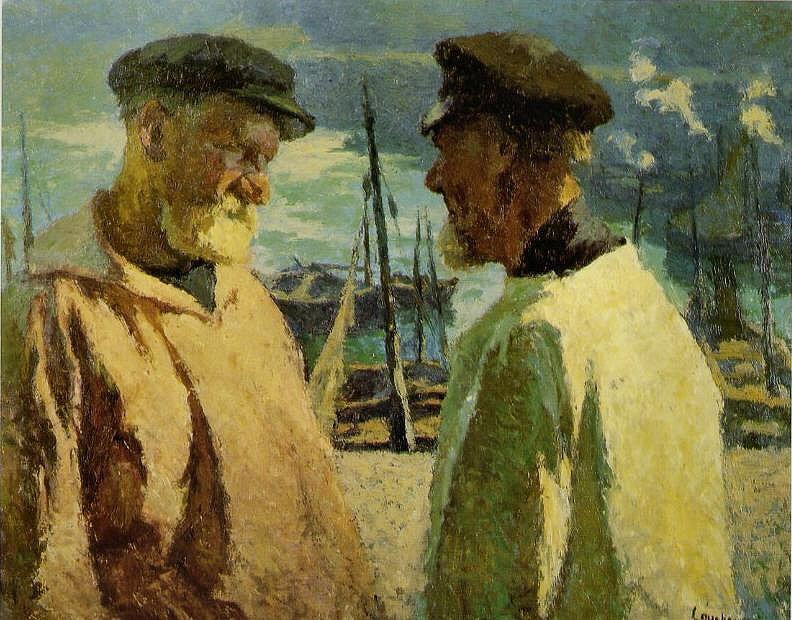
Marcel Couchaux, Pêcheurs à Honfleur, 1920

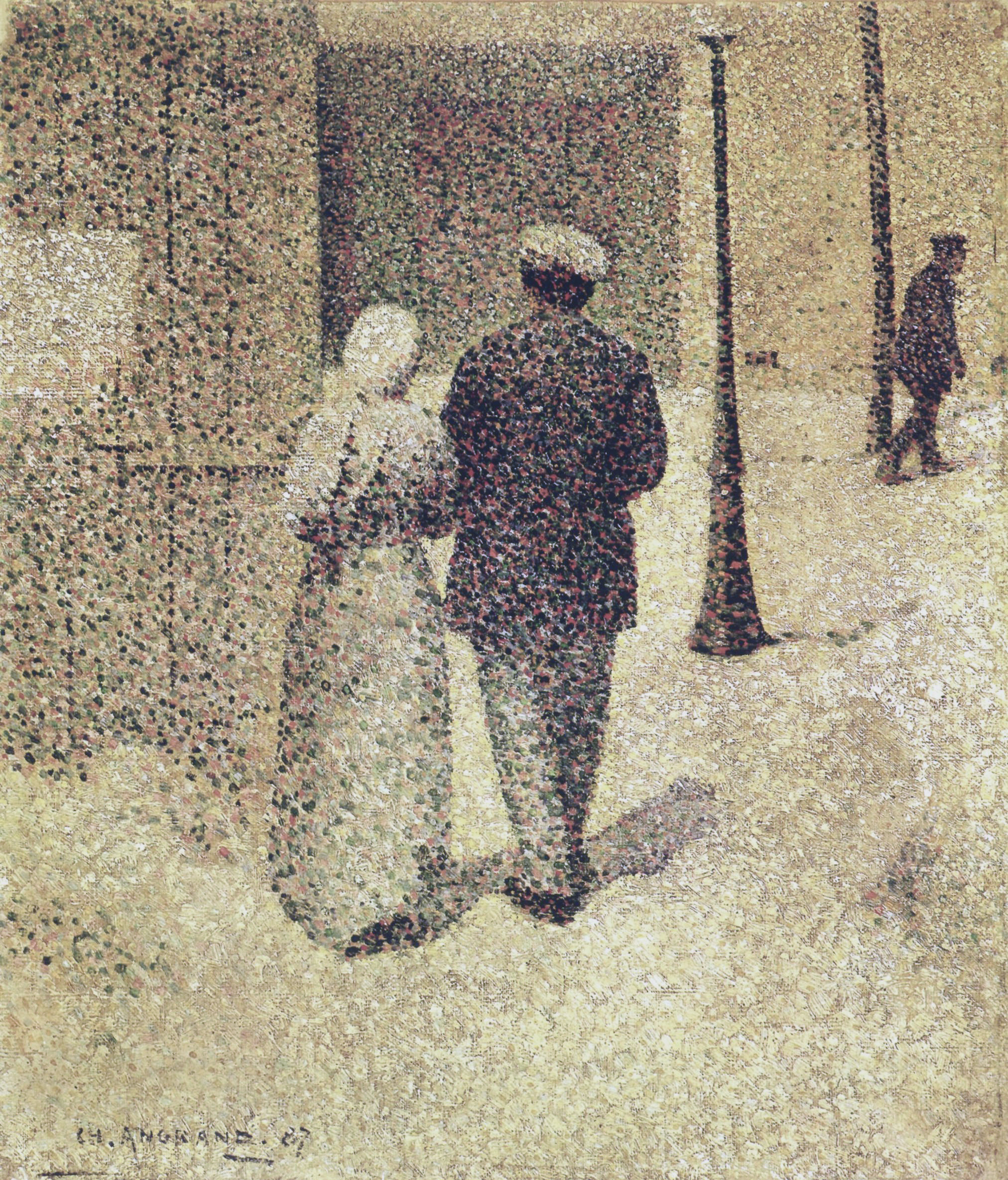
Charles Angrand, Couple dans la rue, 1887

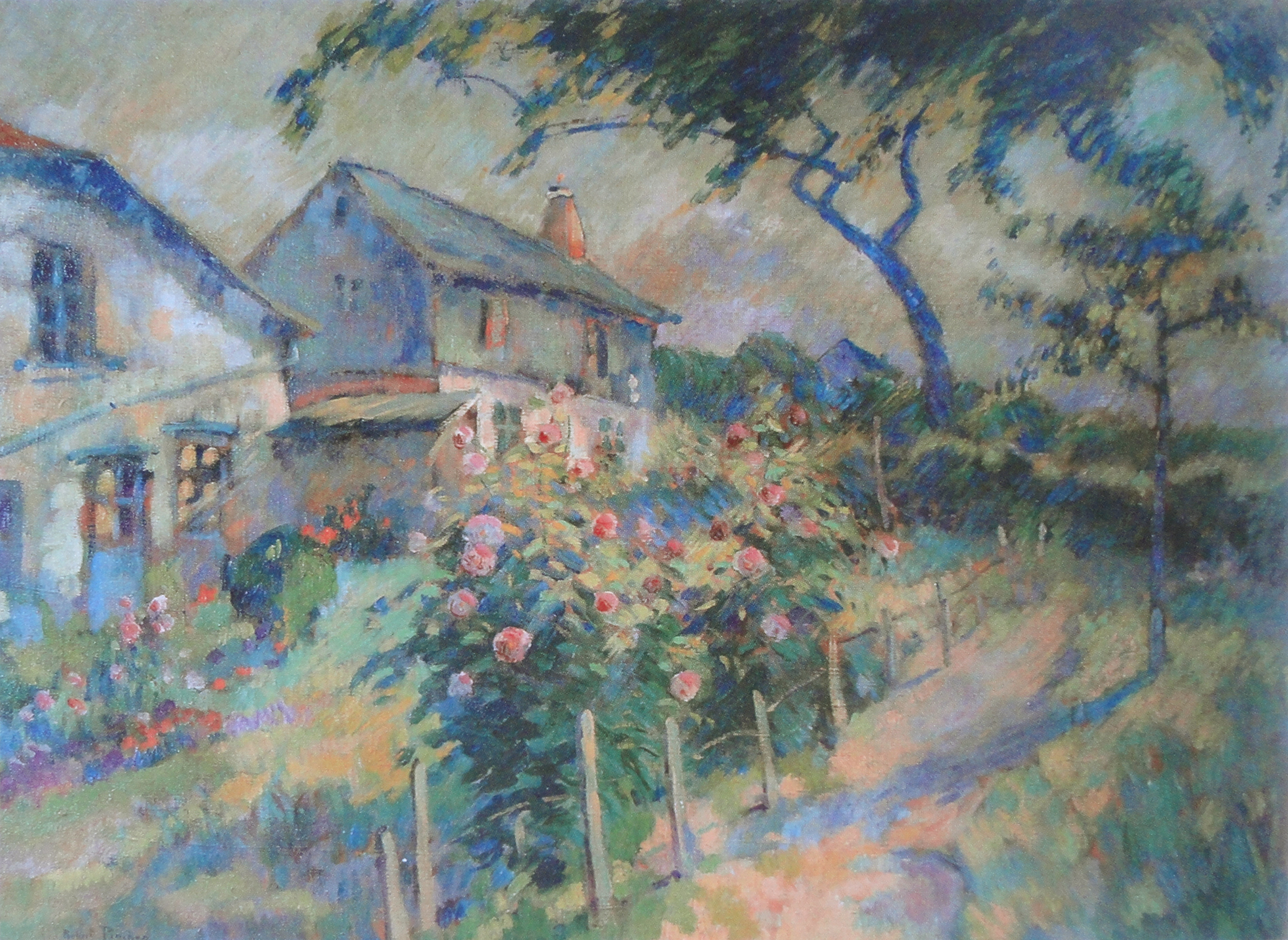
Robert Antoine Pinchon, Le Vallon du temps perdu

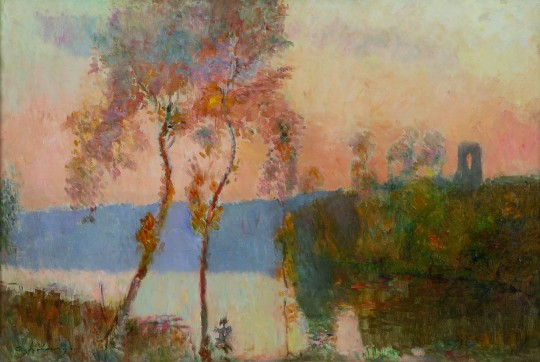
Albert Lebourg, Chalou Moulineux, 1910

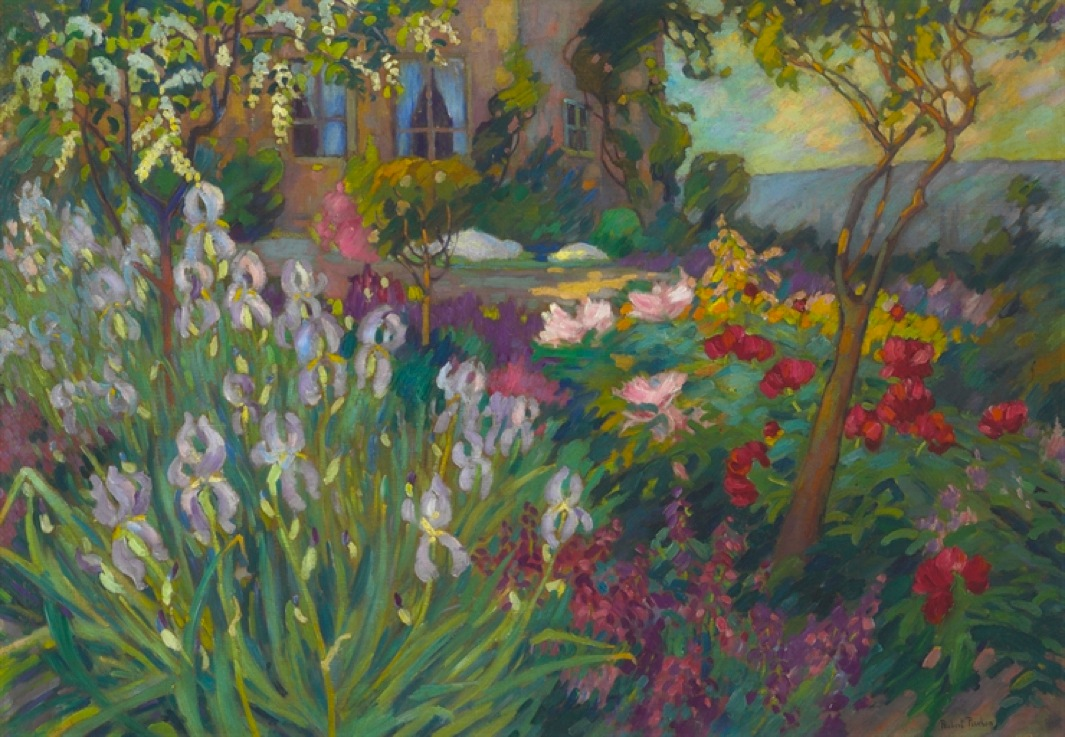
Robert Antoine Pinchon, Le jardin aux iris, c.1920

== Representatives ==
- Charles Angrand
- Édouard de Bergevin
- Léonard Bordes
- Georges Bradberry
- Marcel Couchaux
- Georges Cyr
- Joseph Delattre
- Gaston Duhamel
- Pierre Dumont
- Alfred Dunet
- Charles Frechon
- Michel Frechon
- Isabelle de Ganay
- Narcisse Guilbert
- Narcisse Hénocque
- Madelaine Hippolyte
- Pierre Hodé
- Magdeleine Hue
- Albert Lebourg
- Raimond Lecourt
- Léon-Jules Lemaître
- Suzanne Léon
- Maurice Louvrier
- Pierre Le Trividic
- Gaston Loir
- Maurice Louvrier
- Hyppolite Madelaine
- Albert Malet
- Paul Mascart
- Robert Antoine Pinchon
- Raymond Quibel
- René Sautin
- Adrien Segers
- Jean Thieulin
- Eugène Tirvert
- Maurice Vaumousse
- Henri Vignet
- Jean Charles Contel

== Bibliography ==
- L'École de Rouen, Rouen, BDS, coll. « La Vie de Rouen », 1972, 236 p.
- L'École de Rouen, in abc antiquités beaux-arts curiosités, no 188, June 1980
- François Lespinasse (preface by François Bergot), L'École de Rouen, Sotteville-lès-Rouen, Rouen-Offset, 1980, 221 p.
- Caroline Larroche, 7 peintres de l'école de Rouen, Paris, Galerie Alain Letailleur, 1990, broché, 184 p.
- François Lespinasse, L'École de Rouen, Lecerf, Rouen, 1995 (ISBN 2-901342-04-3)
- François Lespinasse, La Normandie vue par les peintres, Edita, Lausanne, 1988
- L'École de Rouen de l'impressionnisme à Marcel Duchamp 1878-1914, Musée des Beaux-Arts de Rouen, 1996 (ISBN 2-901431-12-7)
- François Lespinasse, Rouen, paradis des peintres, 2003 (ISBN 978-2-906130-04-3)
- François Lespinasse, Journal de l'École de Rouen 1877-1945, 2006 (ISBN 2-906130-01-X)
- L'École de Rouen, de l'impressionnisme au cubisme, soixante ans de modernité en Normandie, Pont-Audemer, Musée Canel, 2008

== See also ==
- Société Normande de Peinture Moderne
- Section d'Or
