= Pierre Dumont (painter) =

French painter (1884–1936)

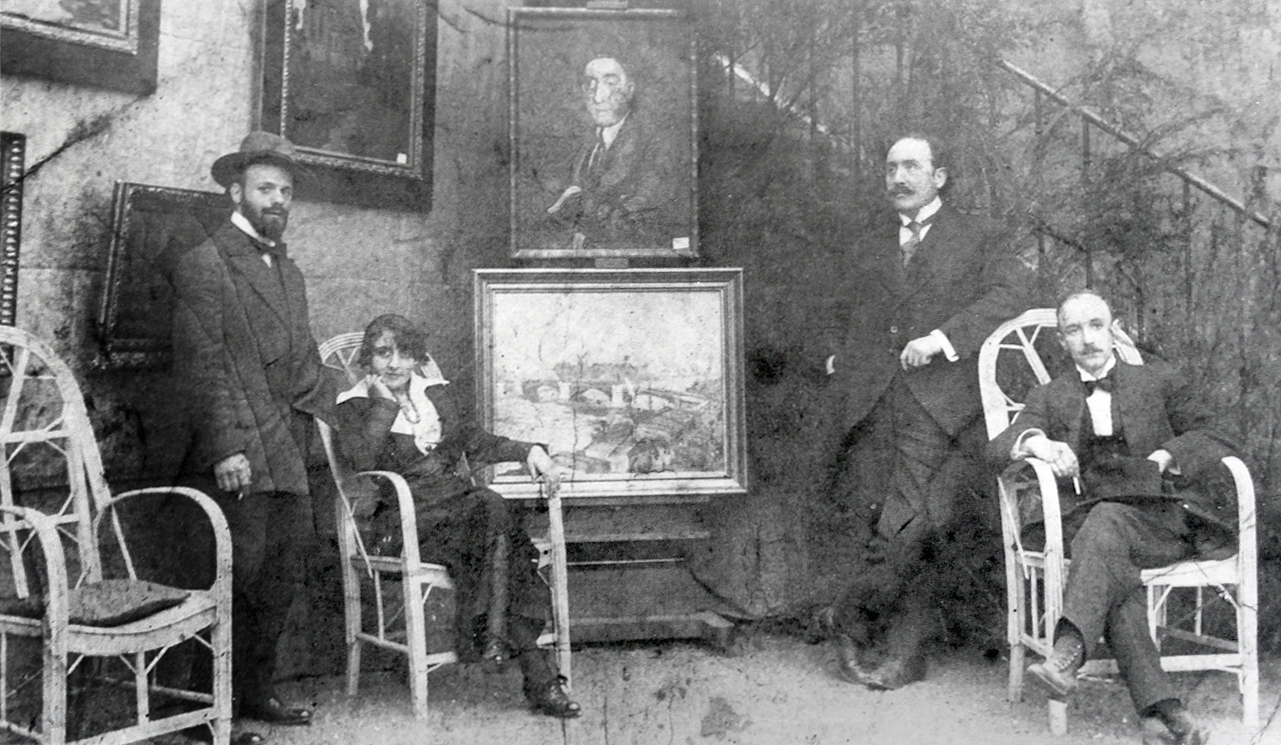
From left to right: Robert Antoine Pinchon, Mrs. Dumont, La Broue and Pierre Dumont, at an exhibition before World War I

Pierre Jean Baptiste Louis Dumont (29 March 1884, in 5th arrondissement, Paris – 8 April 1936, in Paris) more commonly known as Pierre Dumont, was a French painter of the Rouen School. He was schooled at the Lycée Pierre-Corneille and subsequently studied painting with Joseph Delattre. Dumont founded the Groupe des XXX (1907), and along with Robert Antoine Pinchon, Yvonne Barbier, and Eugène Tirvert founded the Société Normande de Peinture Moderne (1909). From 1910 to 1916 Dumont lived at the Le Bateau-Lavoir becoming friends with Juan Gris, Max Jacob and Guillaume Apollinaire. He turned towards Cubism during this period and played a crucial role in the organization of the Salon de la Section d'Or at the Galerie La Boétie in Paris, October 1912.

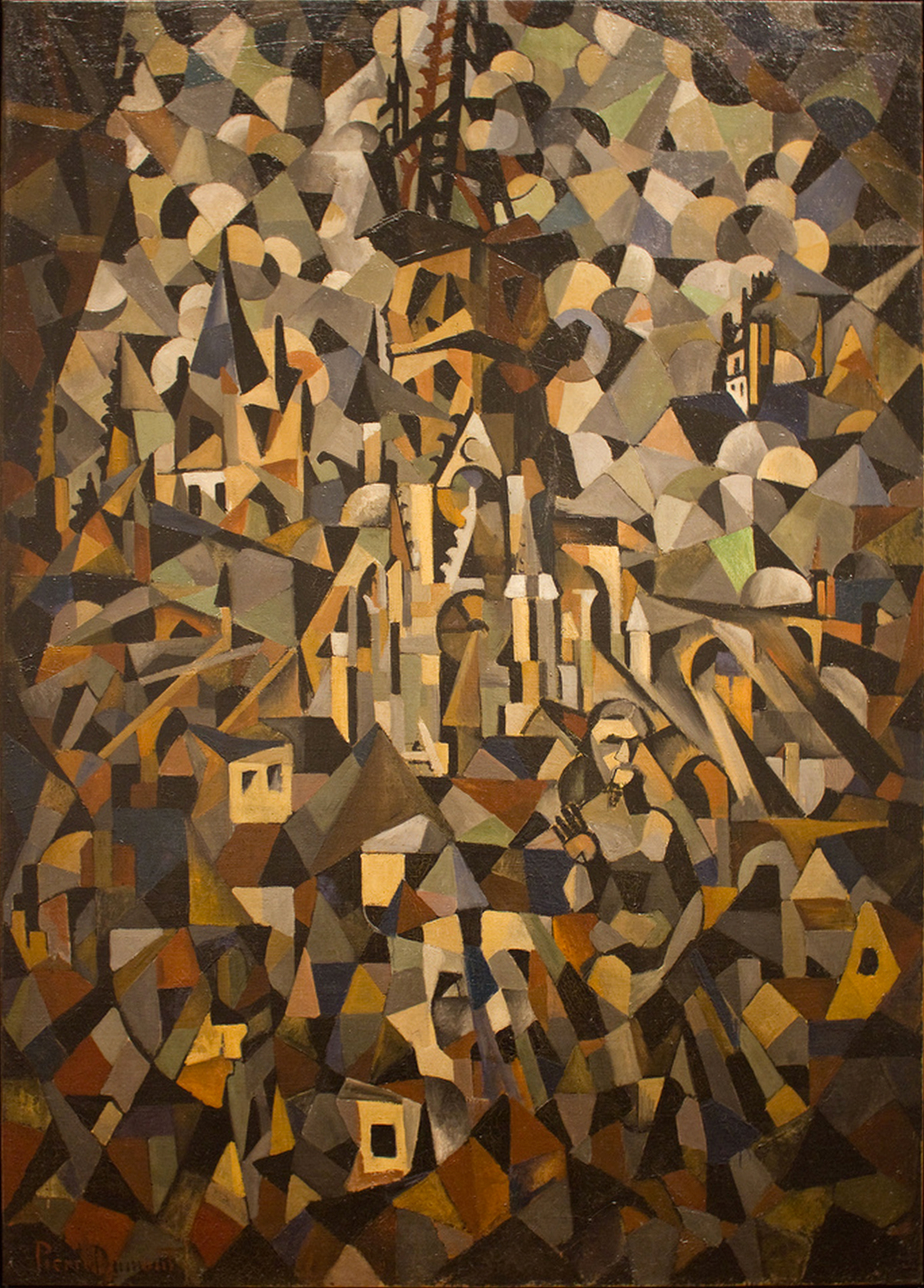
Pierre Dumont, c.1912, Cathédrale de Rouen (Rouen Cathedral), oil on canvas, 192.4 x 138.7 cm, Milwaukee Art Museum

== Bibliography ==
- Pierre Dumont, Les arts des Indépendants, Les Hommes du Jour, April 1912
- François Lespinasse, L'École de Rouen, Fernandez, Sotteville-lès-Rouen, 1980
- François Lespinasse, L'École de Rouen, Lecerf, Rouen, 1995 (ISBN 2901342043)
- L'École de Rouen de l'impressionnisme à Marcel Duchamp 1878-1914, Musée des Beaux-Arts de Rouen, 1996 (ISBN 2-901431-12-7)
