= Joseph Delattre =

French painter

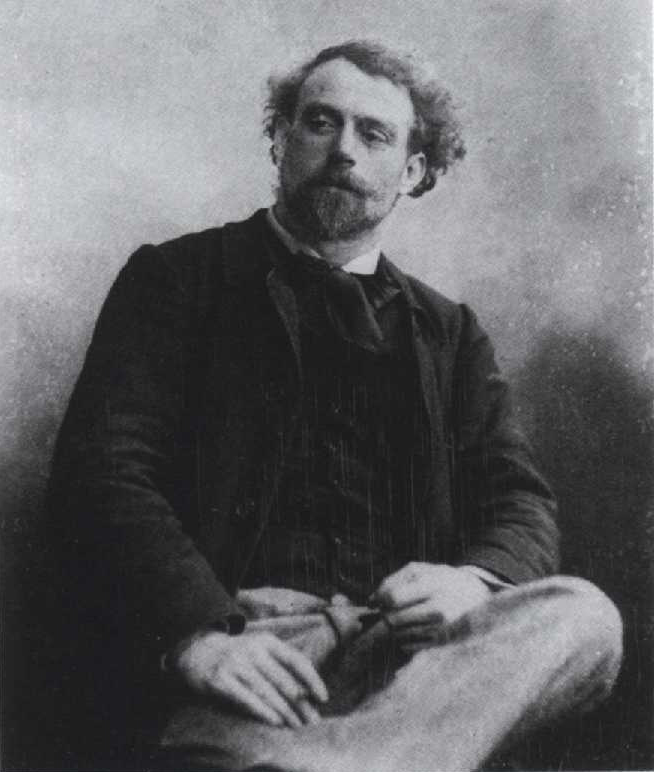
- The artist c.1880
- Born: 20 August 1858; Déville-lès-Rouen, France
- Died: 6 August 1912 (aged 53)
- Known for: Painting
- Movement: Impressionism, Post-Impressionism, École de Rouen

Joseph Delattre (20 August 1858, Déville-lès-Rouen – 6 August 1912) was a French painter of the Rouen School. He exhibited at the Fifth Impressionist Exhibition of 1880.

== Life and career ==
Delattre was a faithful friend Charles Angrand and Claude Monet, the fierce advocates of new ideas and Impressionism. His first paintings form part of the Barbizon school tradition, progressively evolving with greater freedom, simplified shapes, and faded contours lines. As the conventional character of his paintings became further removed, the general public's misunderstanding of his work grew.

In 1895 Delattre founded the Académie libre (Free Academy) on rue des Charrettes in Rouen. The workshop, including excursions outdoors to work En plein air at Pré-aux-Loups or Côte Sainte-Catherine, became a rallying point for young independent artists of the new generation of l'École de Rouen. His students included Pierre Dumont and Robert Antoine Pinchon.

Joseph Delattre formed close ties with Léon Jules Lemaître and Charles Frechon. The three towards the end of the 1880s, influenced by the Pointism of Camille Pissarro, were referred to as the les trois mousquetaires.

Chemin Joseph-Delattre in Barentin is named after him, as are the Rue Joseph-Delattre in Canteleu, Maromme Le Mesnil-Esnard, Pavilly and Rouen.

Admired by a generation of artists from Rouen, he wrote modestly: "Je n'aurai donné qu'un petit son de flûte mais il aura été juste".

== Bibliography ==
- Le Prix Bouctot (beaux-arts) de 1910 : les peintres Henri Cauchois & Joseph Delattre, Cagniard, Rouen, 1910
- Bernard Du Chatenet, Joseph Delattre, 1858-1912, BDS, Rouen, 1974, 151 p.
- François Lespinasse, L'École de Rouen, Fernandez, Sotteville-lès-Rouen, 1980
- François Lespinasse, Joseph Delattre 1858-1912, 1985
- François Lespinasse, L'École de Rouen, Lecerf, Rouen, 1995, ISBN 2901342043
- L'École de Rouen de l'impressionnisme à Marcel Duchamp 1878-1914, Musée des Beaux-Arts de Rouen, 1996, ISBN 2-901431-12-7

== Gallery ==
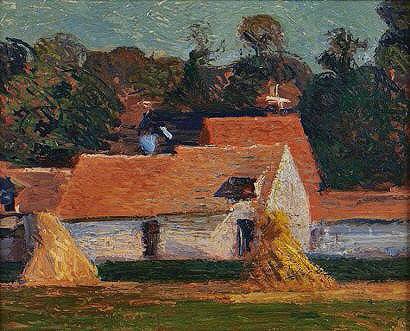
Farm at Déville, private collection

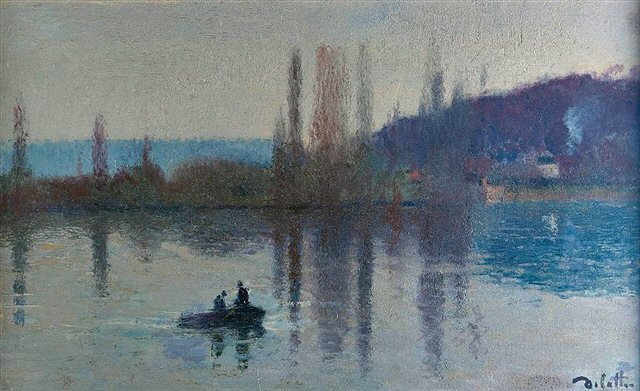
The Lake, private collection

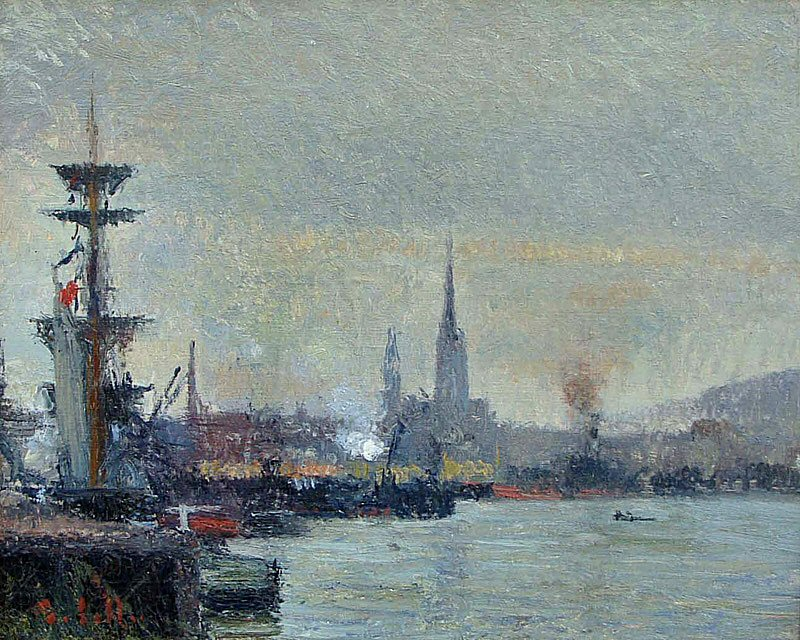
The Port of Rouen, private collection

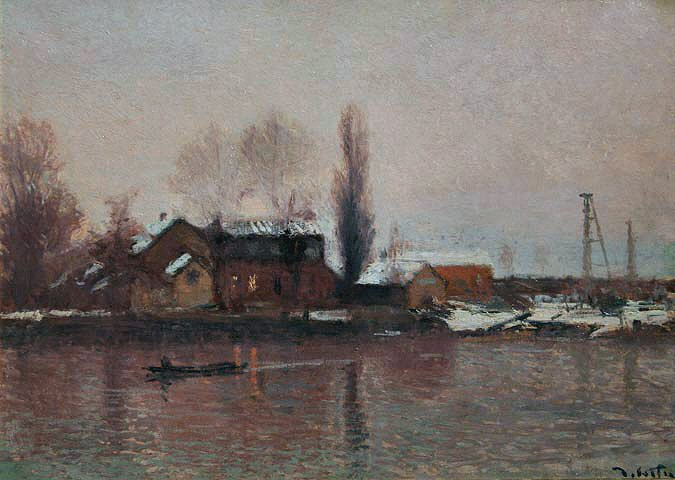
Prairie Saint-Gervais sous la neige, private collection
