= Section d'Or =

Art group associated with Cubism

Jean Metzinger, 1911-1912, La Femme au Cheval (Woman with a horse), oil on canvas, 162 x 130 cm, Statens Museum for Kunst, National Gallery of Denmark. Published in Apollinaire's 1913 Les Peintres Cubistes; exhibited at the 1912 Salon des Indépendants. Provenance: Jacques Nayral, Niels Bohr

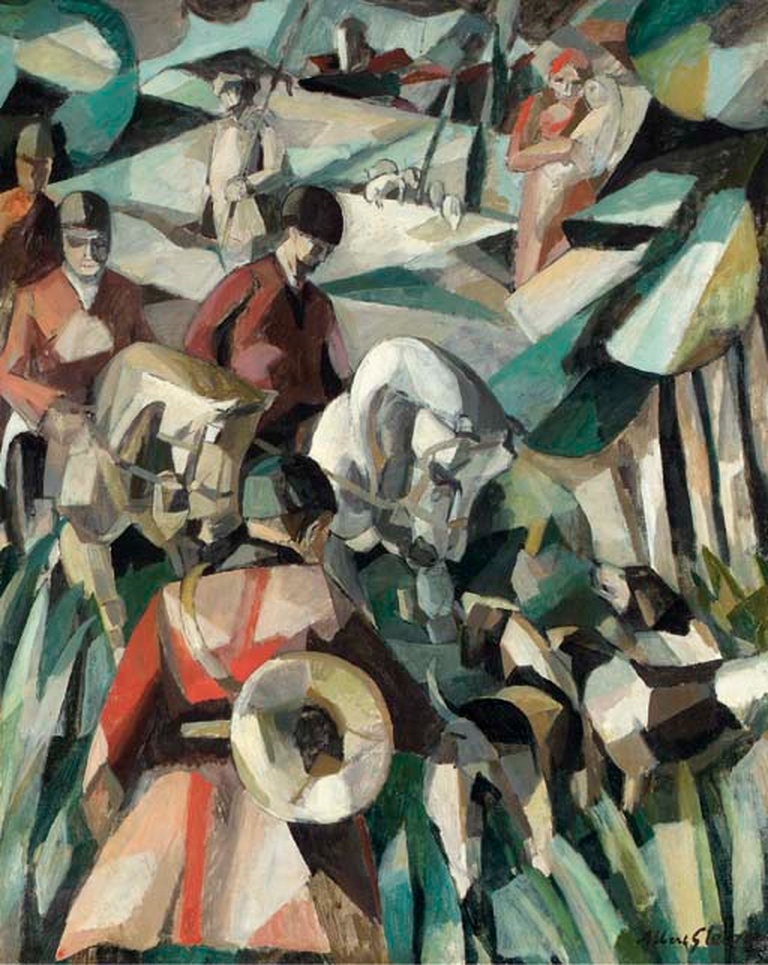
Albert Gleizes, 1911, La Chasse (the Hunt), oil on canvas, 123.2 x 99 cm. Published in L'Intransigeant, 10 October 1911, Les Peintres Cubistes 1913, by G. Apollinaire, and 'Au Salon d'Automne', Revue d'Europe et d'Amérique, Paris, October 1911. Exhibited at the 1911 Salon d'Automne, Valet de Carreau (Jack of Diamonds), Moscow, 1912, and Galerie de la Boétie, Salon de la Section d'Or, Paris, 1912

The Section d'Or ("Golden Section"), also known as Groupe de Puteaux or Puteaux Group, was a collective of painters, sculptors, poets and critics associated with Cubism and Orphism. Based in the Parisian suburbs, the group held regular meetings at the home of the Duchamp brothers in Puteaux and at the studio of Albert Gleizes in Courbevoie. Active from 1911 to around 1914, members of the collective came to prominence in the wake of their controversial showing at the Salon des Indépendants in the spring of 1911. This showing by Albert Gleizes, Jean Metzinger, Robert Delaunay, Henri le Fauconnier, Fernand Léger and Marie Laurencin (at the request of Apollinaire), created a scandal that brought Cubism to the attention of the general public for the first time.

The Salon de la Section d'Or, held October 1912—the largest and most important public showing of Cubist works prior to World War I—exposed Cubism to a wider audience still. After the war, with support given by the dealer Léonce Rosenberg, Cubism returned to the front line of Parisian artistic activity. Various elements of the Groupe de Puteaux would mount two more large-scale Section d'Or exhibitions, in 1920 and in 1925, with the goal of revealing the complete process of transformation and renewal that had transpired since the onset of Cubism.

The group seems to have adopted the name "Section d'Or" as both an homage to the mathematical harmony associated with Georges Seurat, and to distinguish themselves from the narrower style of Cubism developed in parallel by Pablo Picasso and Georges Braque in the Montmartre quarter of Paris. In addition, the name was to highlight that Cubism, rather than being an isolated art-form, represented the continuation of a grand tradition; indeed, the golden ratio, or golden section (French: Section d'Or), had fascinated Western intellectuals of diverse interests for at least 2,400 years.

== History ==
The Puteaux Group (an offshoot of la Société Normande de Peinture Moderne) organized their first exhibition under the name Salon de la Section d'Or at the Galerie La Boétie in Paris, October 1912. Albert Gleizes and Jean Metzinger, in preparation for the Salon de la Section d'Or, published a major defense of Cubism, resulting in the first theoretical essay on the new movement, entitled Du "Cubisme" (published by Eugène Figuière in 1912, translated to English and Russian in 1913).

Following the 1911 Salon exhibitions, the group formed by Le Fauconnier, Metzinger, Gleizes, Léger and R. Delaunay expanded to include several other artists; Alexander Archipenko, Joseph Csaky, Roger de La Fresnaye, Juan Gris, and Jean Marchand, who were virtually unknown to the public before the Salon des Indépendants of 1911, began to frequent Puteaux and Courbevoie. František Kupka had lived in Puteaux for several years in the same complex as Jacques Villon. Francis Picabia was introduced to the circle, perhaps by Guillaume Apollinaire (usually accompanied by Marie Laurencin) with whom he had recently become friendly. Most importantly was the contact established with Metzinger and the Duchamp brothers, who exhibited under the names of Jacques Villon, Marcel Duchamp and Duchamp-Villon. The opening address was given by Apollinaire. The participation of many of these artists in the formation of Les Artistes de Passy in October 1912 was an attempt to transform the Passy district of Paris into yet another art-centre; a further sign of a growing emphasis on communal activity that would culminate in the Section d'Or exhibit.

=== Origins of the term ===
Marcel Duchamp, 1912, Nude Descending a Staircase, No. 2, oil on canvas, 147 cm × 89.2 cm (57.9 in × 35.1 in), Philadelphia Museum of Art. Exhibited at the Salon de la Section d'Or, 1912, Armory Show, 1913, New York

The idea of the Section d'Or originated in the course of conversations between Gleizes, Metzinger and Jacques Villon. The group's title was suggested by Villon, after reading a 1910 translation of Leonardo da Vinci's A Treatise on Painting by Joséphin Péladan. Péladan attached great mystical significance to the golden section (French: nombre d'or), and other similar geometric configurations. For Villon, this symbolized his belief in order and the significance of mathematical proportions, because it reflected patterns and relationships occurring in nature. Jean Metzinger and the Duchamp brothers were passionately interested in mathematics. Jean Metzinger, Juan Gris and possibly Marcel Duchamp at this time were associates of Maurice Princet, an amateur mathematician credited for introducing profound and rational scientific arguments into Cubist discussions. The name 'Section d'Or' represented simultaneously a continuity with past traditions and current trends in related fields, while leaving open future developments in the arts.

Art historian Daniel Robbins argued that in addition to referencing the mathematical golden section, the term associated with the Salon Cubists also refers to the name of the earlier Bandeaux d'Or group, with which Albert Gleizes and other former members of the Abbaye de Créteil had been deeply involved.

=== Salon de la Section d'Or, 1912 ===
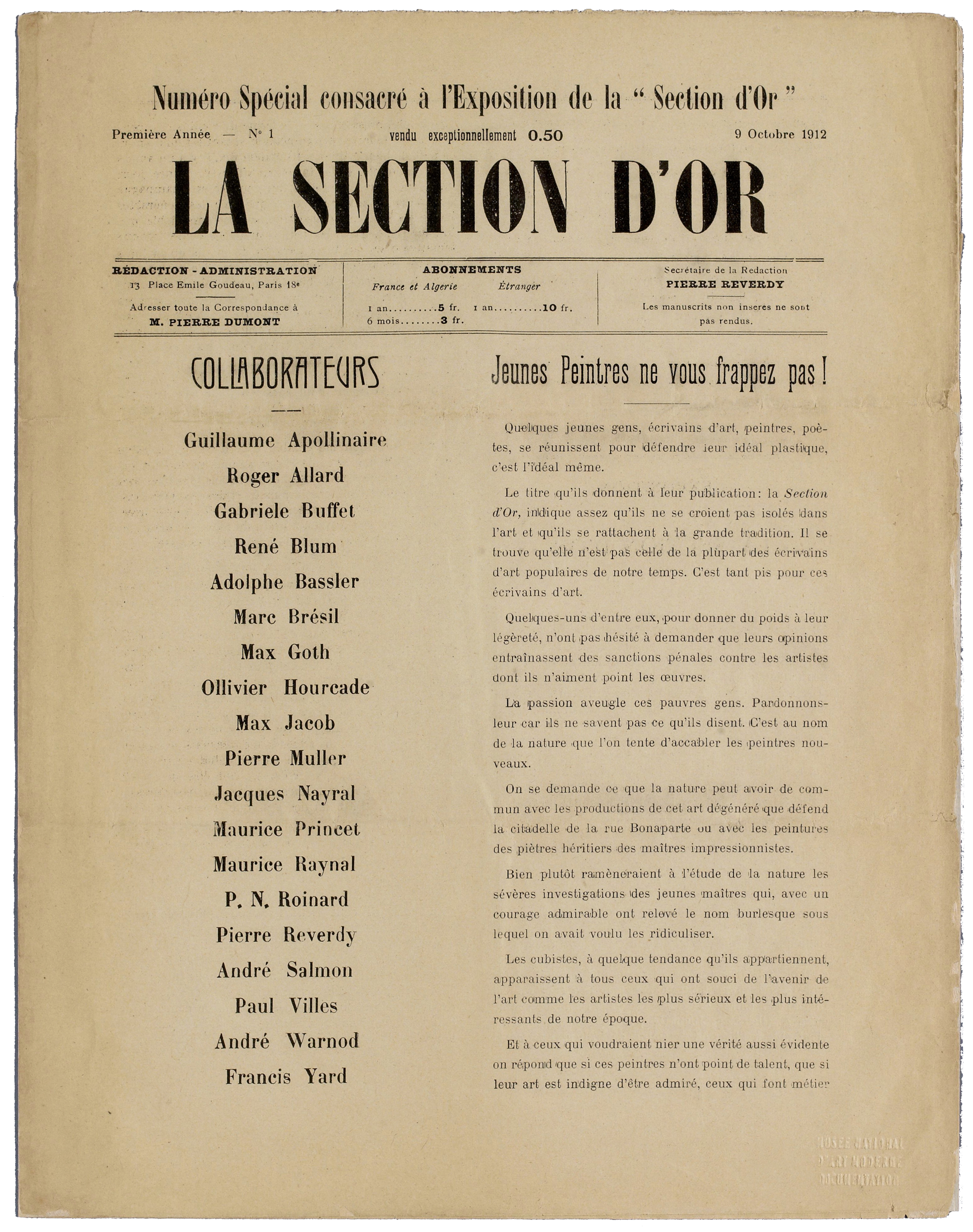
Special issue dedicated to the Exhibition of the Section d'Or, first year, no.1, 9 October 1912

The 1912 Salon de la Section d'Or was arguably the most important pre-World War I Cubist exhibition. In the previous year the Cubists and a large number of their associates had exhibited at the Galerie de l'Art Contemporain (rue Tronchet, Paris) under the auspices of the Société Normande de Peinture Moderne. This exhibition had received some attention in the press (l'Autorité and Paris Journal), though due to the diversity of the works presented it had been referred to as an exposition des fauves et cubistes. The Salon de la Section d'Or, however, was generally accepted as being entirely Cubist in nature. Over 200 works were displayed, and the fact that many of the artists showed artworks representative of their development from 1909 to 1912 gave the exhibition the allure of a Cubist retrospective.

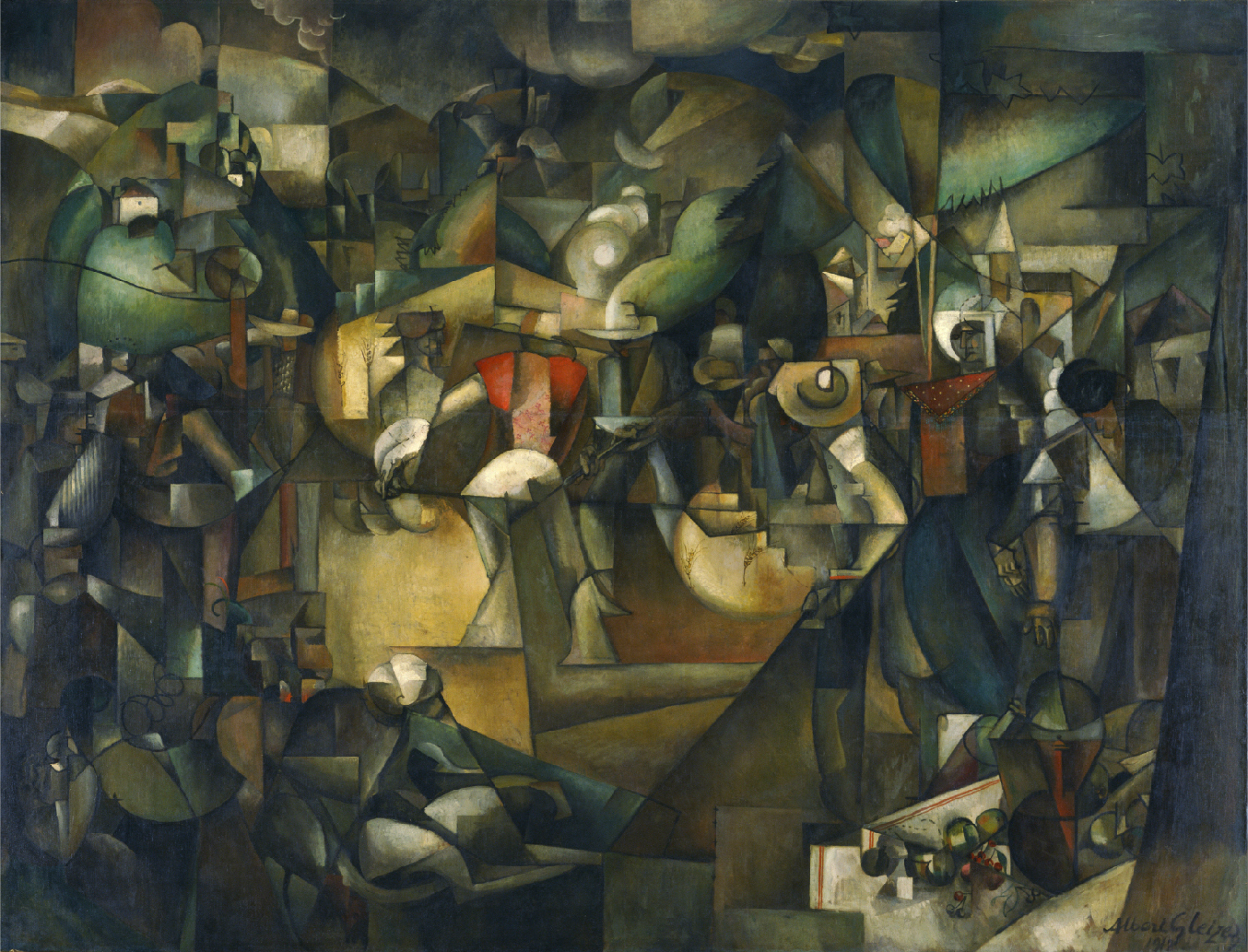
Albert Gleizes, 1912, Harvest Threshing (Le Dépiquage des Moissons), oil on canvas, 269 x 353 cm, National Museum of Western Art, Tokyo

Though the Salle 41 Cubists had been surprised by the highly impassioned reactions generated by the 1911 Salon des Indépendants showing, they appear to have been eager to attract as much attention as possible with the Salon de la Section d'Or. The inauguration was held from nine until midnight, for which the only precedent was the opening of the 1903 Salon d'Automne. Invitations were widely diffused prior to the show, and many of the guests had to be turned away on opening night (9 October 1912). Lectures by Apollinaire, Hourcade and Raynal were advertised, and a review, La Section d'Or, was published to coincide with the Vernissage; with contributions by Guillaume Apollinaire, Roger Allard, René Blum, Olivier Hourcade, Max Jacob, Maurice Raynal, Pierre Reverdy, André Salmon, André Warnod and others.

The fact that the 1912 exhibition had been curated to show the successive stages through which Cubism had transited, and that Du "Cubisme" had been published for the occasion, indicates the artists' intention of making their work comprehensible to a wide audience (art critics, art collectors, art dealers and the general public). Undoubtedly, due to the great success of the exhibition, Cubism became recognized as a tendency, genre or style in art with a specific common philosophy or goal: a new avant-garde movement.

== Selected works; 1912 exhibition ==
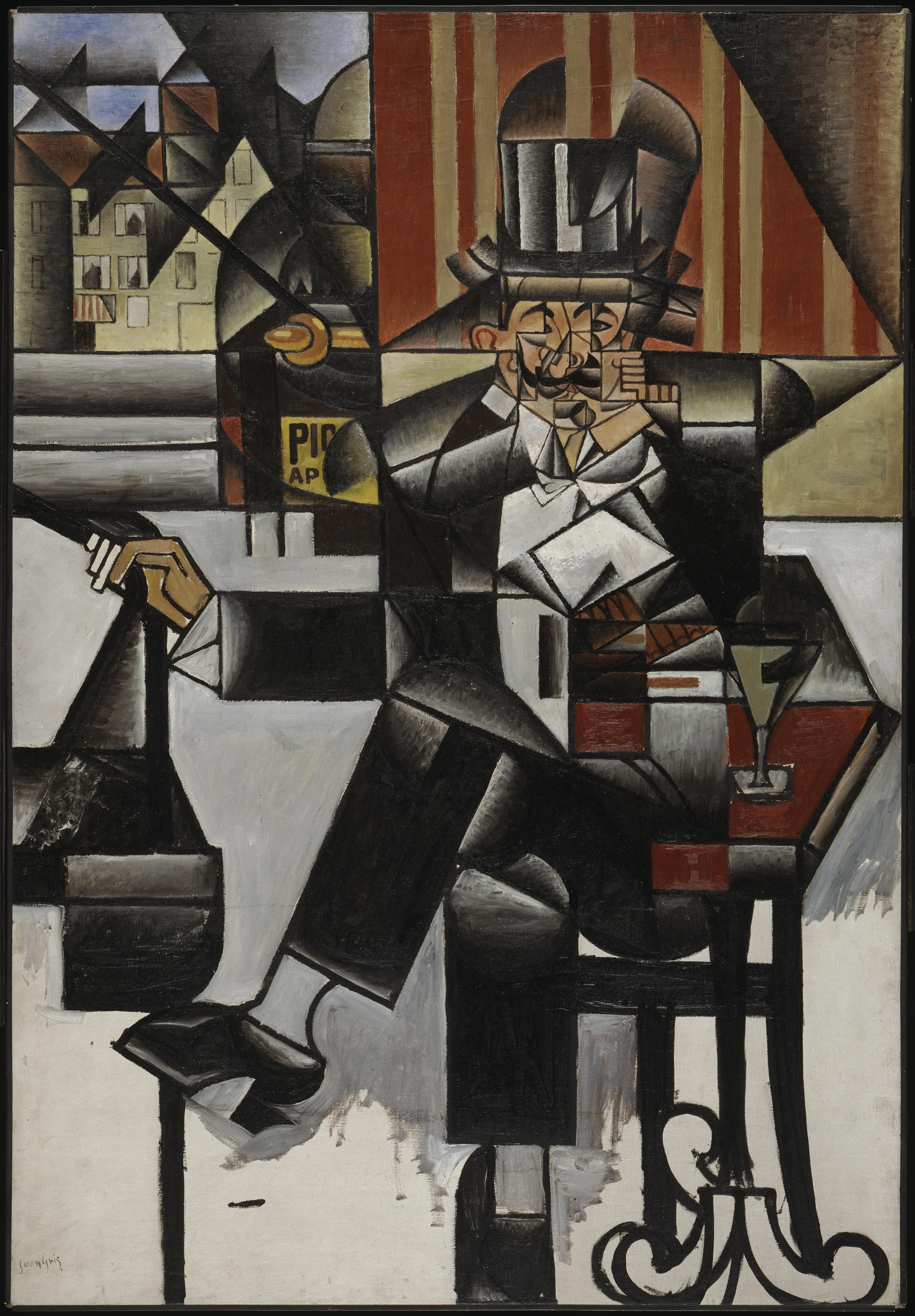
Juan Gris, 1912, Man in a Café, oil on canvas, 127.6 x 88.3 cm, Philadelphia Museum of Art. Exhibited at the 1912 Salon de la Section d'Or

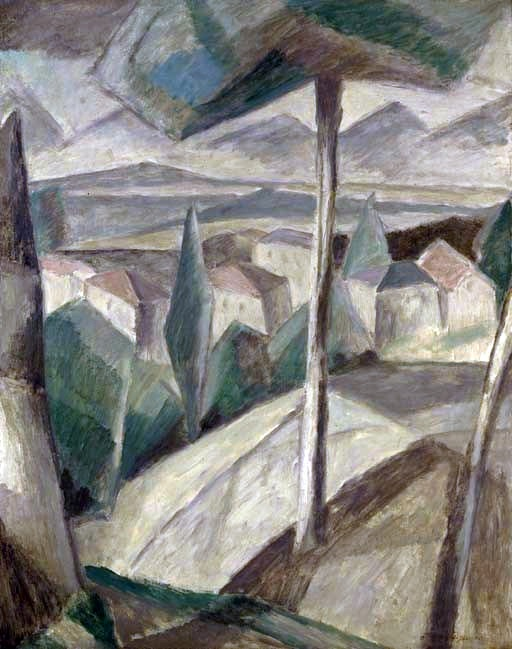
Albert Gleizes, 1910, L'Arbre (The Tree), oil on canvas, 92 x 73.2 cm, private collection

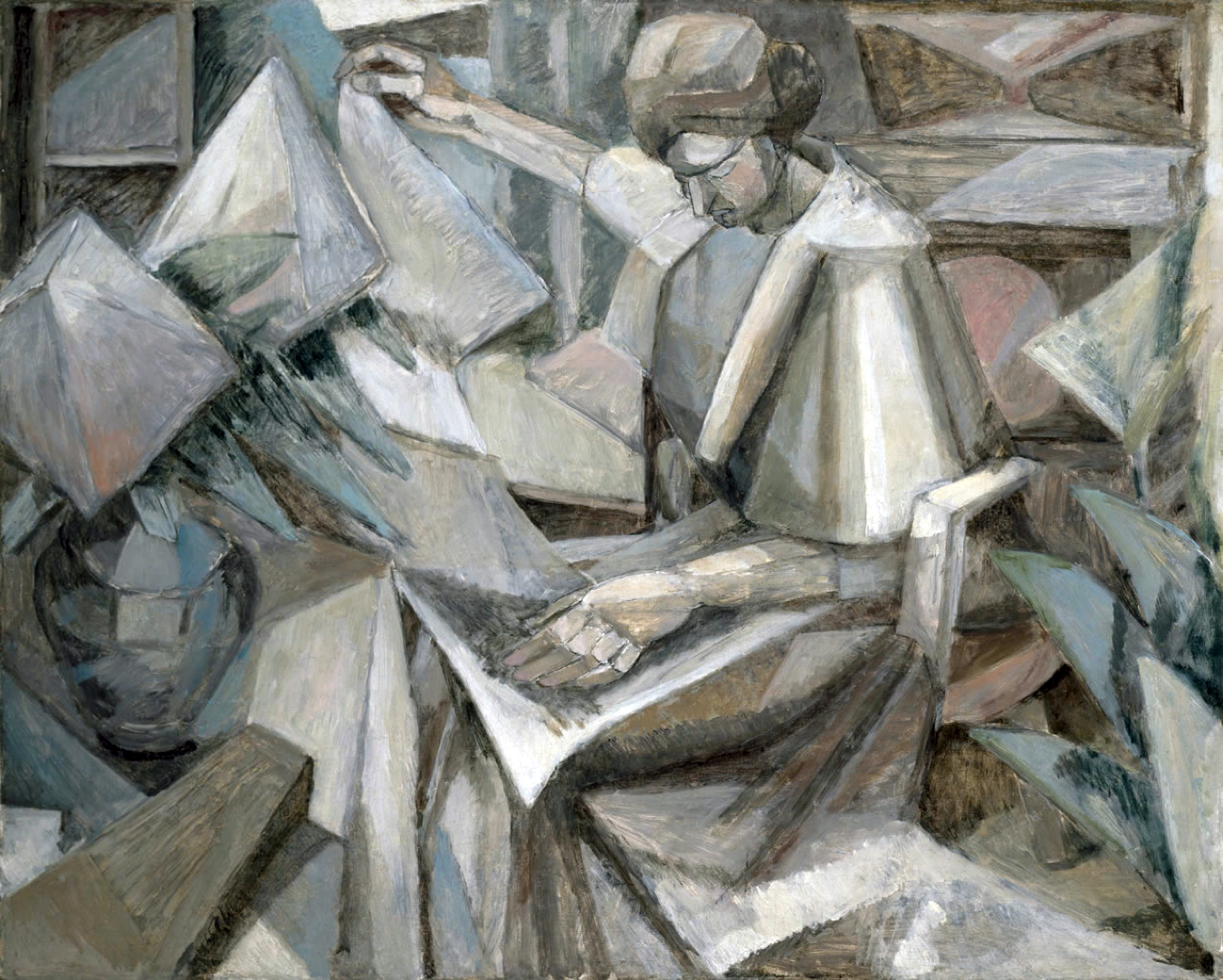
Albert Gleizes, 1910, La Femme aux Phlox (Woman with Phlox), oil on canvas, 81 x 100 cm, Museum of Fine Arts, Houston

Marcel Duchamp, 1910, Joueur d'échecs (The Chess Game), oil on canvas, 114 x 146.5 cm, Philadelphia Museum of Art

Jean Metzinger, 1910–11, Deux Nus (Two Nudes, Two Women, Nus dans un paysage), oil on canvas, 92 x 66 cm, Gothenburg Museum of Art, Sweden

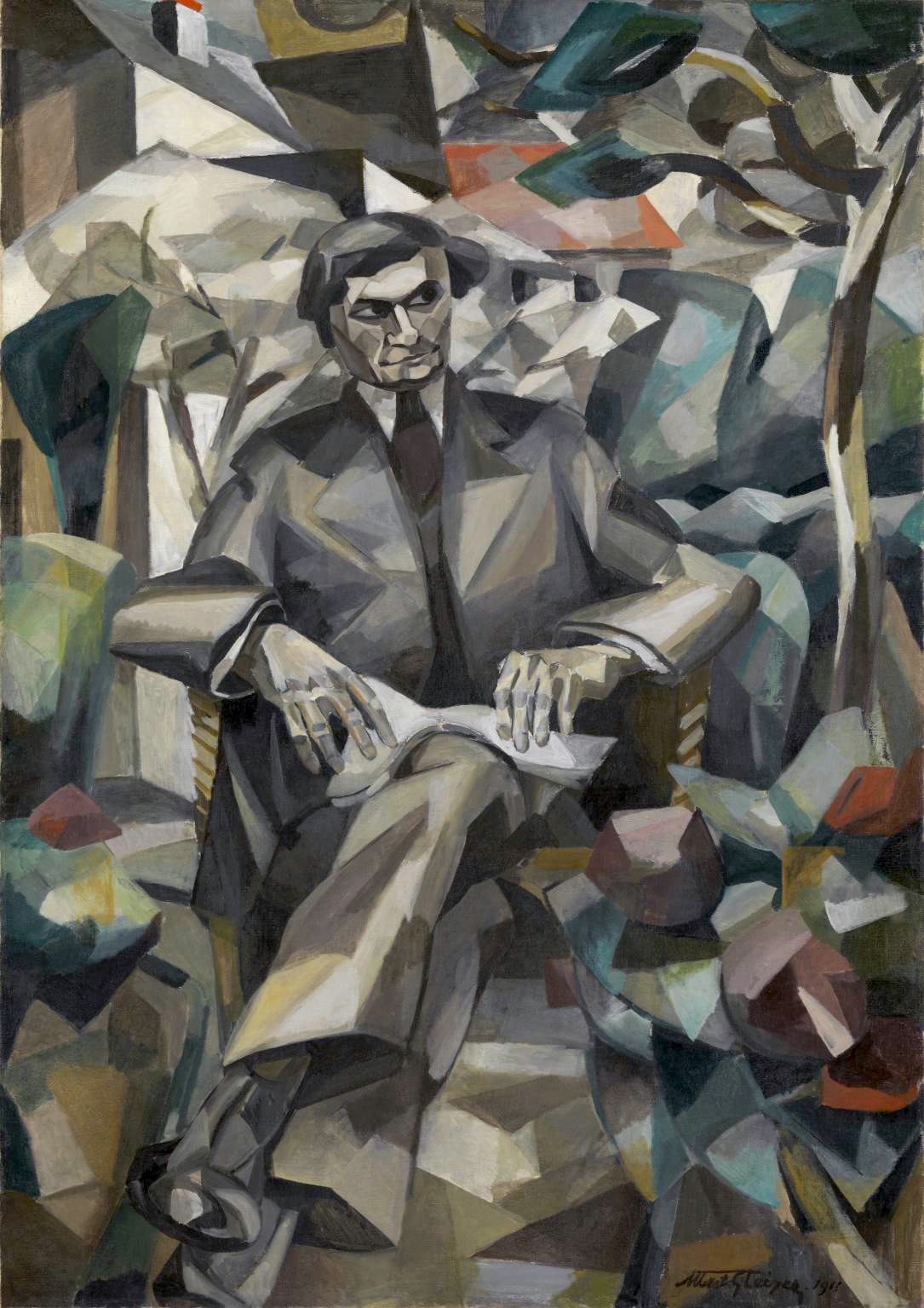
Albert Gleizes, 1911, Portrait de Jacques Nayral, oil on canvas, 161.9 x 114 cm, Tate Modern, London

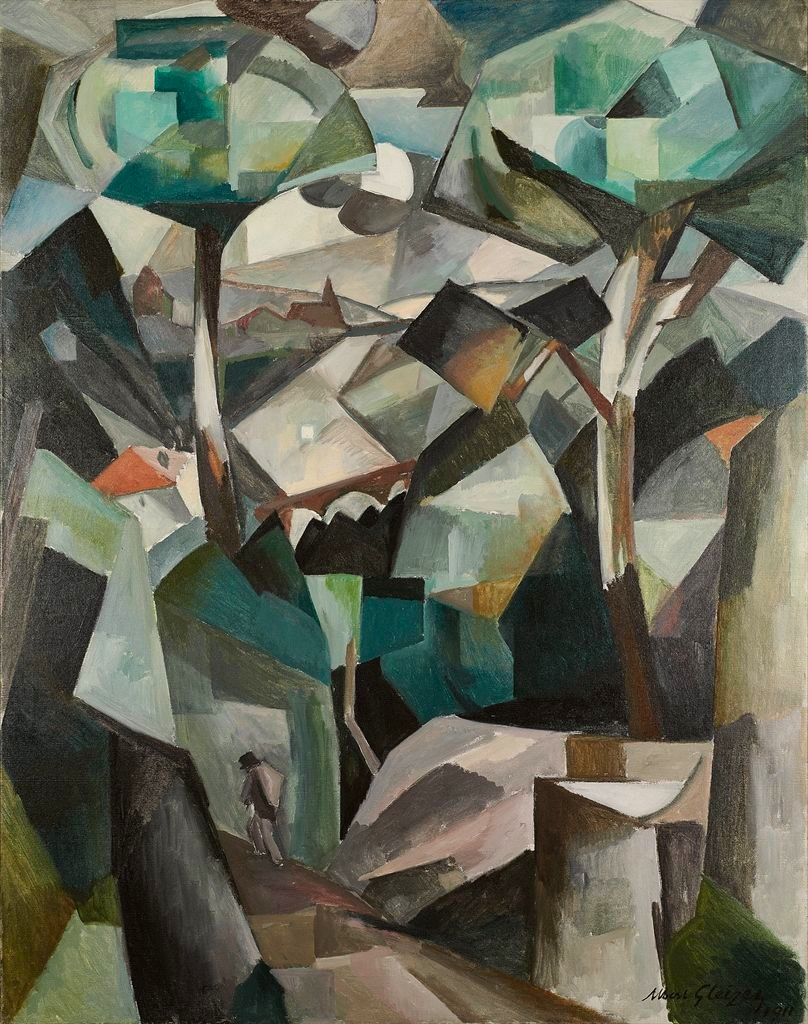
Albert Gleizes, 1911, Le Chemin, Paysage à Meudon, Paysage avec personnage, oil on canvas, 146.4 x 114.4 cm

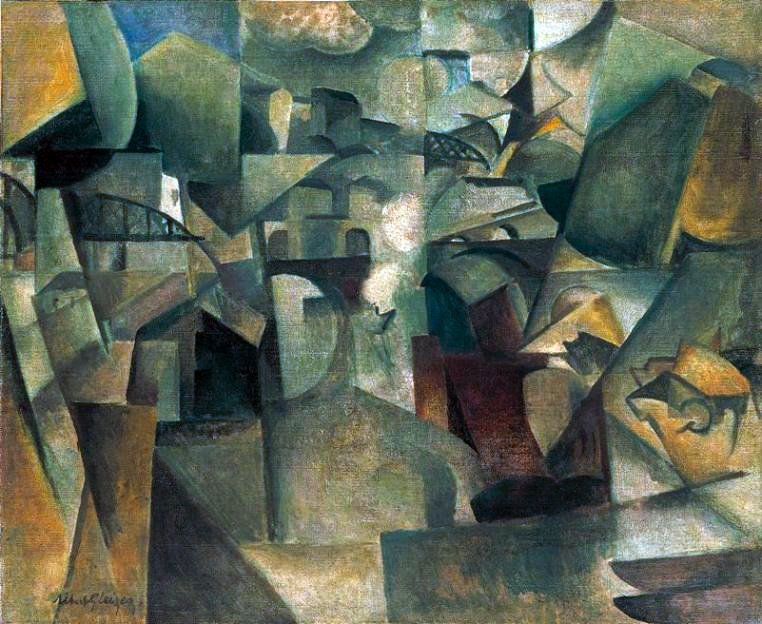
Albert Gleizes, 1912, Les ponts de Paris (Passy), The Bridges of Paris (Passy), oil on canvas, 60.5 x 73.2 cm, Museum Moderner Kunst (mumok), Vienna

Marcel Duchamp, 1912, Le Roi et la Reine entourés de Nus vites (The King and Queen Surrounded by Swift Nudes), oil on canvas, 114.6 x 128.9 cm, Philadelphia Museum of Art

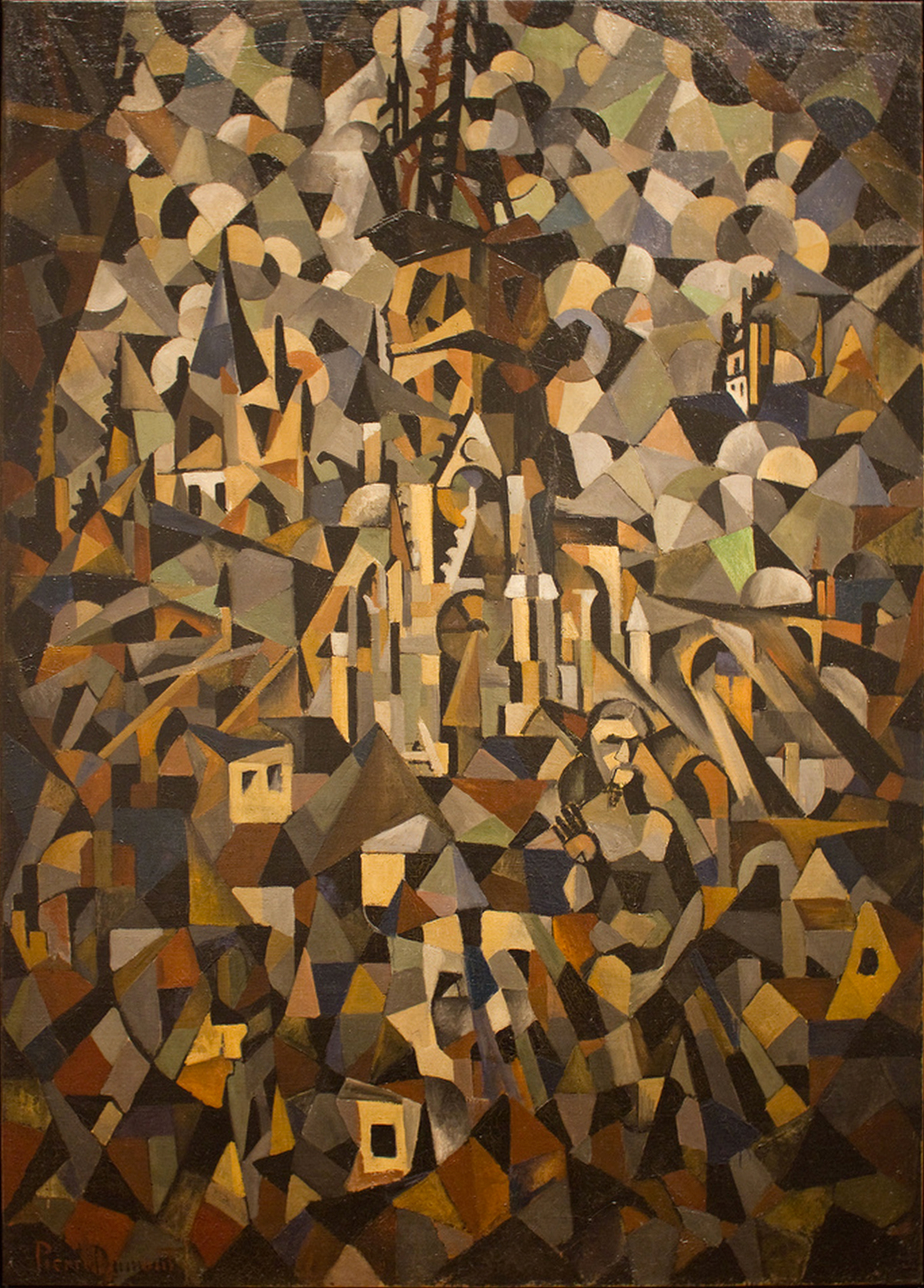
Pierre Dumont, c.1912, Cathédrale de Rouen (Rouen Cathedral), oil on canvas, 192.4 x 138.7 cm, Milwaukee Art Museum

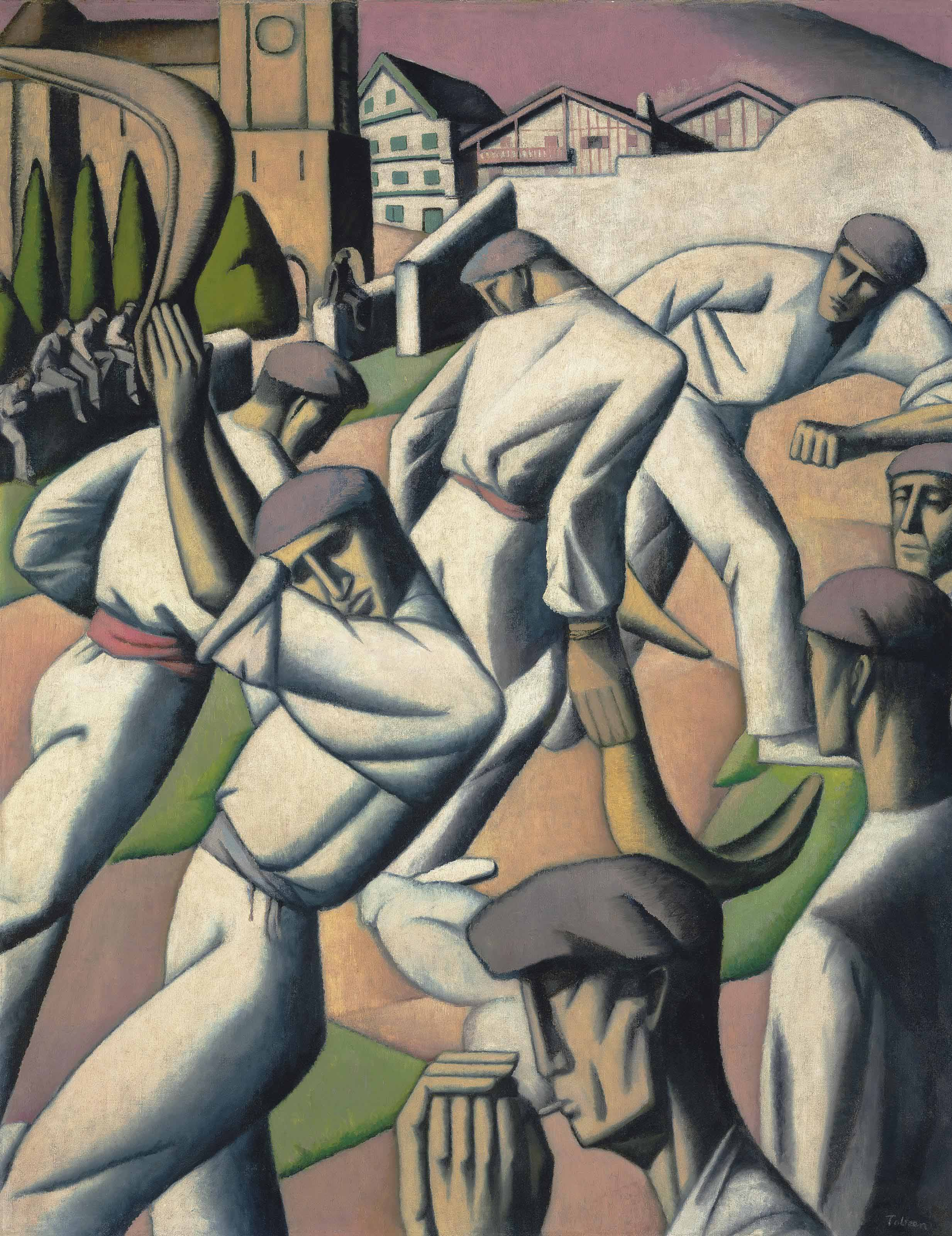
Tobeen, 1912, Pelotaris, oil on canvas, 147.5 x 115.5 cm

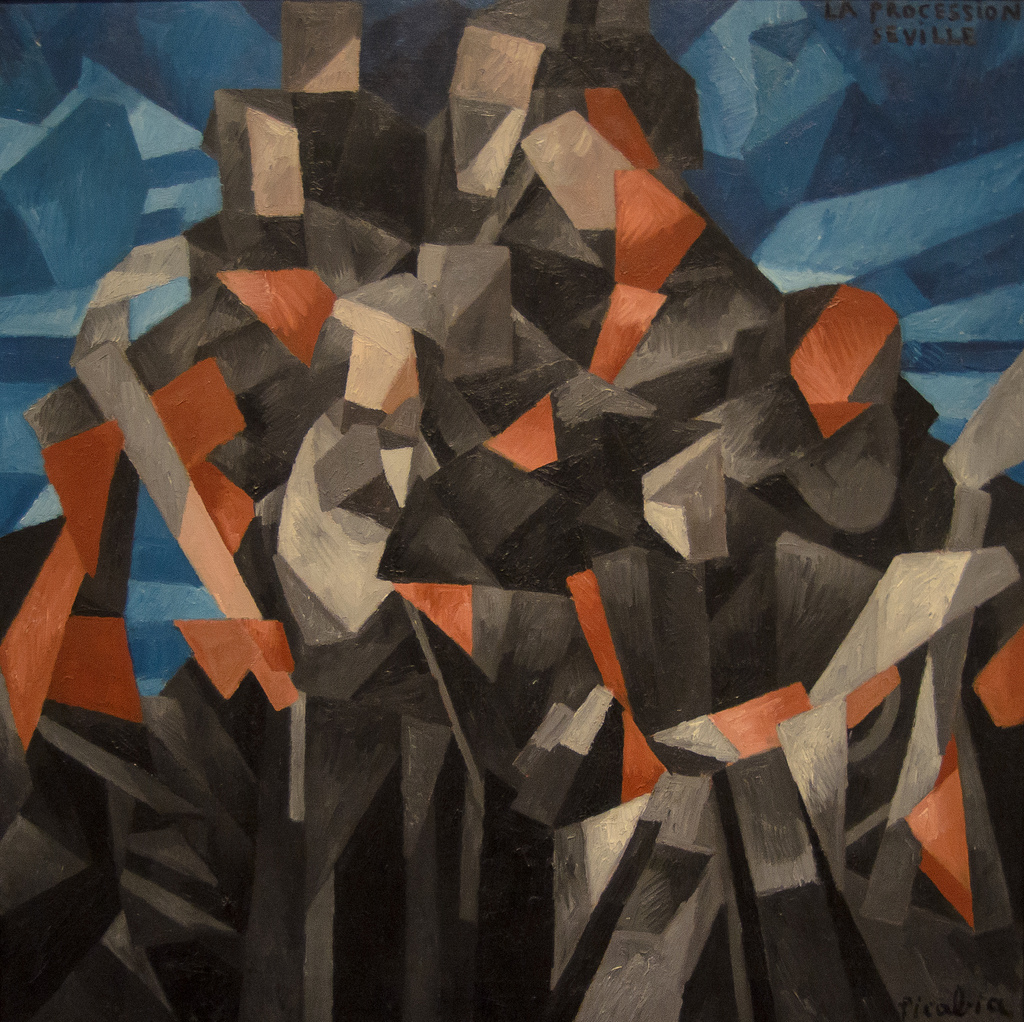
Francis Picabia, 1912, The Procession, Seville, oil on canvas, 121.9 x 121.9 cm, National Gallery of Art, Washington DC.

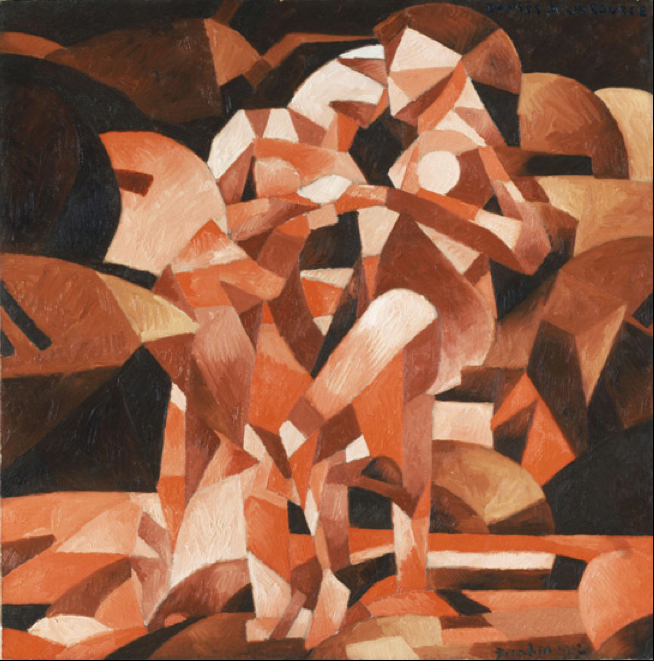
Francis Picabia, 1912, The Dance at the Spring (Danse à la source), oil on canvas, 120.5 x 120.6 cm, Philadelphia Museum of Art

Jacques Villon, 1912, Girl at the Piano (Fillette au piano), oil on canvas, 129.2 x 96.4 cm (51 x 37.8 in), oval, Museum of Modern Art, New York

=== Golden ratio ===
There is some debate on the extent to which works exhibited at the 1912 Salon de la Section d'Or employed the golden ratio, or not. Despite a general interest in mathematical harmony, whether the paintings featured in the celebrated Salon de la Section d'Or exhibition used the golden ratio itself in their compositions is difficult to determine. Analysis by Christopher Green suggests that Juan Gris made use of the golden ratio in composing works that were likely shown at the exhibition.

Art historian David Cottington writes:

It will be remembered that Du "Cubisme", written probably as these paintings were being made, gestured somewhat obscurely to non-Euclidean concepts, and Riemann's theorems; as Linda Henderson has shown, these references betray not an informed understanding of modern mathematics but a shaky hold on some of their principles, culled (indeed plagiarised) from Henri Poincaré's La Science et l'Hypothèse. The authors themselves had little clear idea of how such mathematics related to their art, except as a vague synecdoche for "modern science".

Camfield writes that the use of the golden section at La Section d'Or is rather tentative:

A few of these paintings were moreover based on simple geometrical compositions. Yet, not a single artist there displayed a serious commitment to geometrical proportions with the one exception of Juan Gris. [...] Although all of the Puteaux artists were interested in mathematics (Marcel Duchamp, interview with the author, April 4, 1961), neither Marcel Duchamp nor Jacques Villon, who suggested the title for "La Section d'Or" believes that the golden section was actually used in their paintings. And in Du "Cubisme" Gleizes and Metzinger chastise those painters who would rely on mathematics for certitude.

Camfield says that neither of the paintings he analyses "can be definitively identified with "La Section d'Or" paintings", only that the "stylistic evidence" places them in that period and they "would almost certainly have been shown" there.

From the titles, dates and previous exhibitions listed in the 1912 Salon de la Section d'Or catalogue, many painting have since been identified, for example, Les Baigneuses (The Bathers) and Le goûter (Tea Time), La Femme au Cheval (Woman with a horse), and many more works by Gleizes, Metzinger and others. The main exception is for the works of Juan Gris, since no titles are given for his submissions in the catalogue. However, it is now known, from published correspondence between the artist and the dealer Léonce Rosenberg that 13 paintings by Gris were shown, most of which have been identified by their titles, dates, and dimensions.

Albert Gleizes exhibited Les Baigneuses (The Bathers) at the 1912 Salon de la Section d'Or (catalogue no. 40). The proportions of the canvas correspond exactly to the golden rectangle (a ratio of 1 to 1.618 ± 0.01). This work has a rare dimension of 105 x 171 cm. Gleizes, as most artists at the time, generally used standard format chassis (stretchers), which are not golden rectangles.

In Du "Cubisme" it was argued that Cubism itself was not based on any geometrical theory, but that non-Euclidean geometry corresponded better than classical, or Euclidean geometry, to what the Cubists were doing: "If we wished to relate the space of the [Cubist] painters to geometry, we should have to refer it to the non-Euclidean mathematicians; we should have to study, at some length, certain of Riemann's theorems."

The 1912 compositions of Juan gris, according to art historian Christopher Green, were often "modular and regular... easily fitted to the demands of Golden Section composing in the pictures of the summer, such as Man in a Café and The Watch." The "synthetic and analytic were visibly fused. In the Golden Section paintings... he laid the grids like systems of fault-lines across things, faut-lines on either side of which view-points switch.

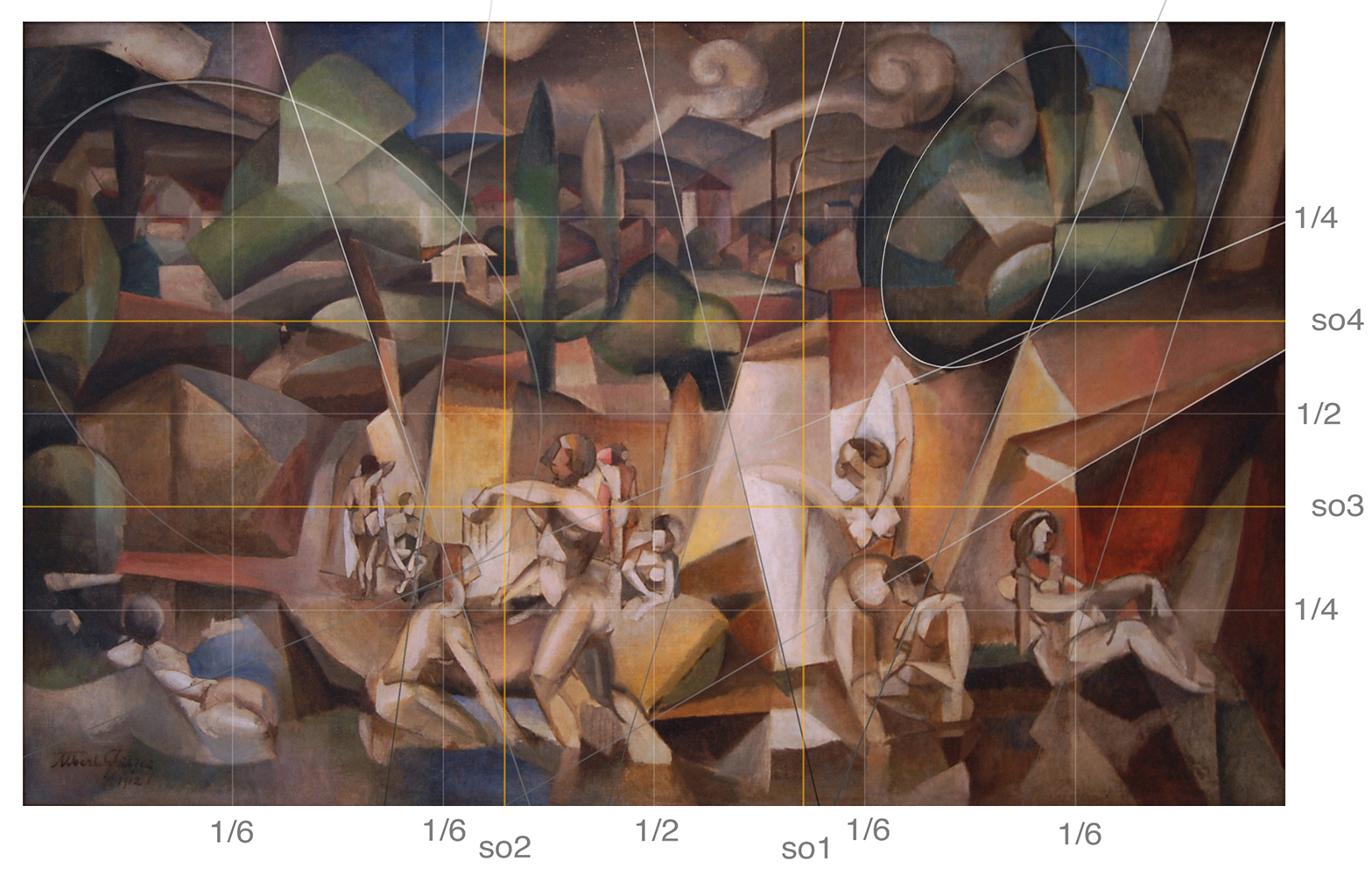
Albert Gleizes, 1912, Les Baigneuses (The Bathers), oil on canvas, 105 x 171 cm, Musée d'Art Moderne de la Ville de Paris, golden rectangle (painting, 1 to 1.618 ± 0.07), golden ratio grid (golden/yellow grid, so1 - so4), and 4 : 6 ratio grid overlay

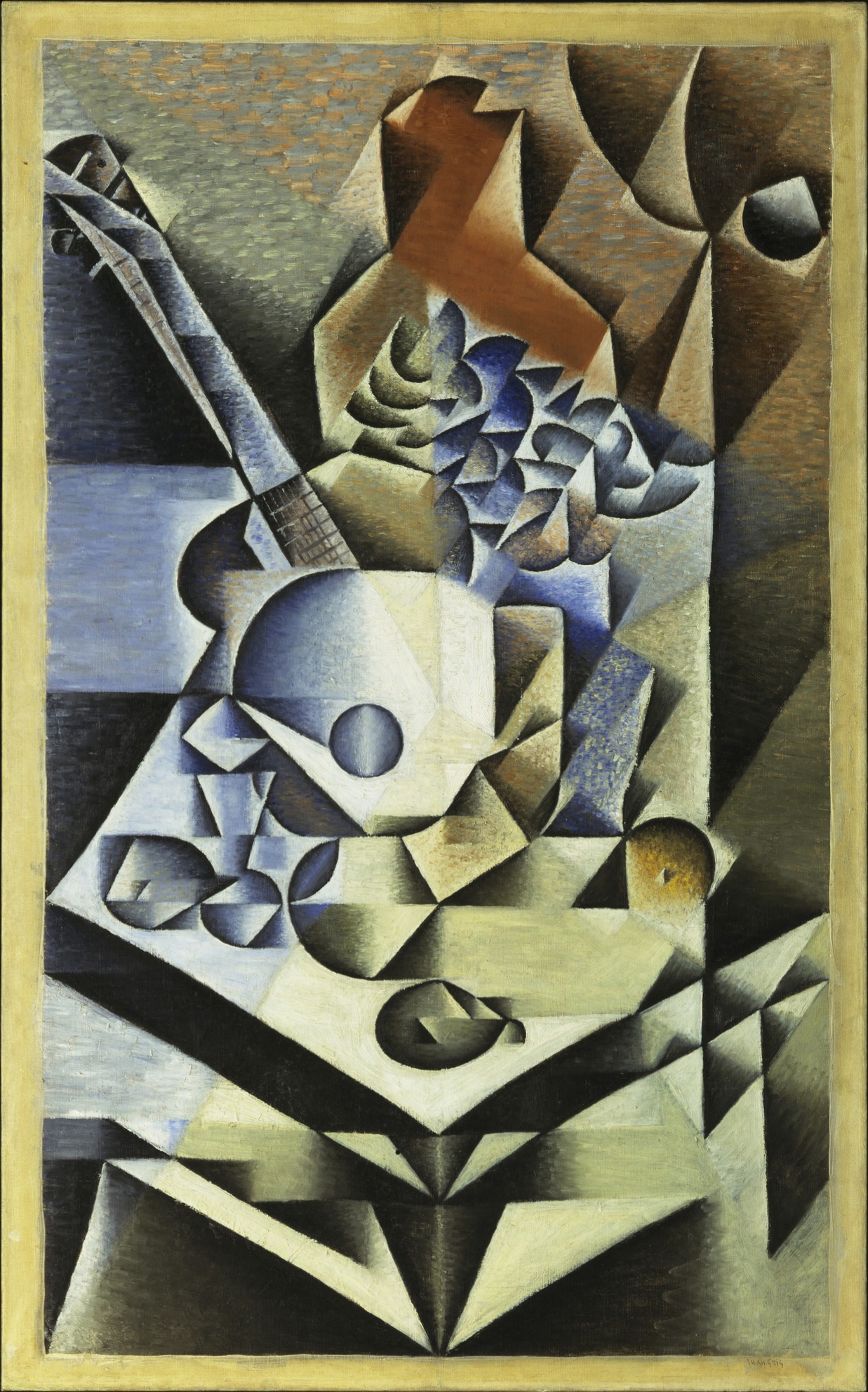
Juan Gris, 1912, Still Life with Flowers, oil on canvas, 112.1 x 70.2 cm, Museum of Modern Art, New York. Precisely a golden rectangle format with a ratio of 1 to 1.618 ± 0.01

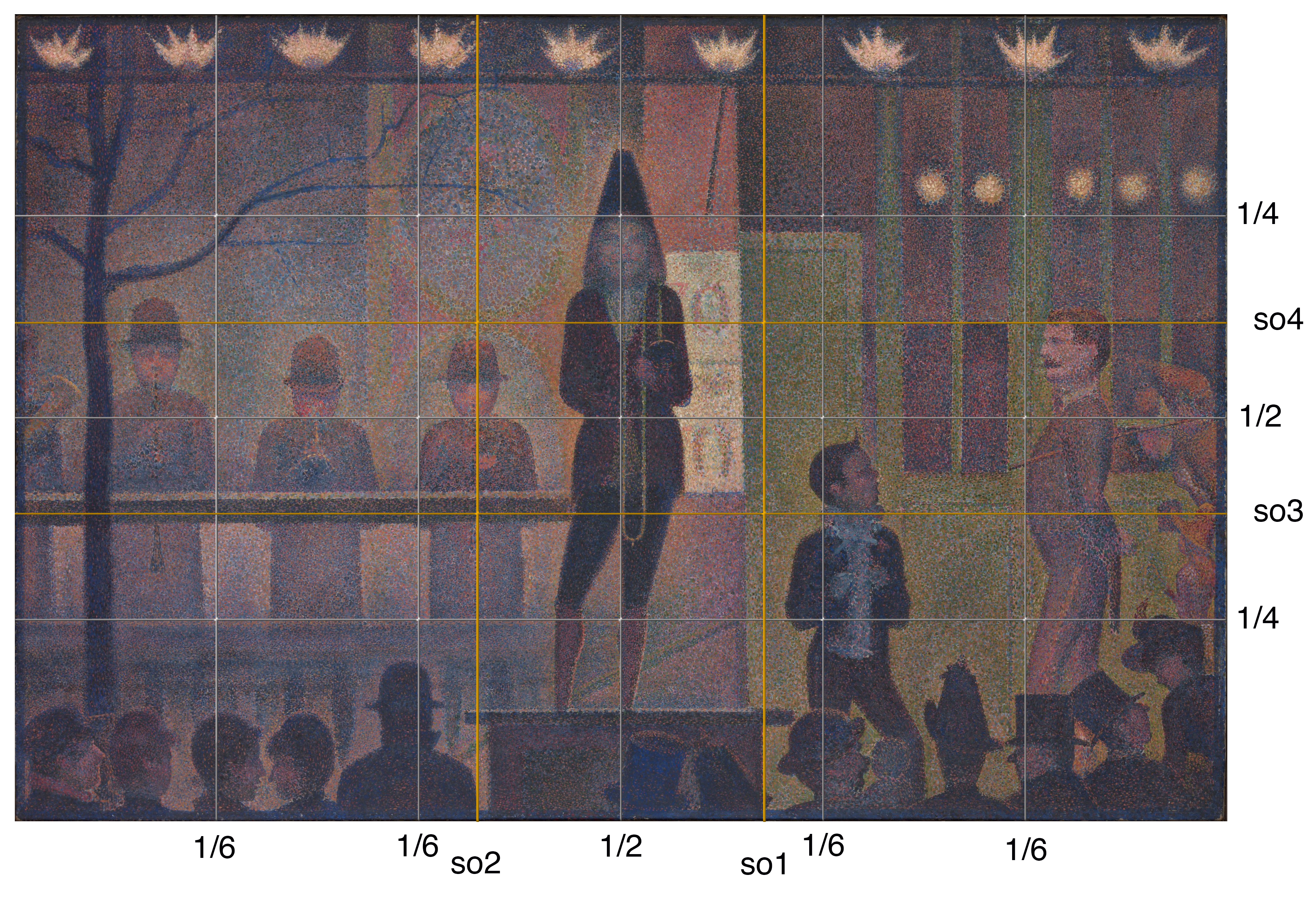
Georges Seurat, 1887–88, Circus Sideshow (Parade de Cirque), oil on canvas, 99.7 × 140.9 cm, Metropolitan Museum of Art. Golden mean overlay (section d'or, so1 - so4) and 4 : 6 ratio grid

=== Homage to Seurat ===
Marcel Duchamp, Nude Descending a Staircase, No. 2; Tobeen, Pelotaris; Pierre Dumont, Cathédrale de Rouen; Francis Picabia, Musique en procession, Henry Valensi, Moscou la sainte; Juan Gris, Man in a Café. Le Cubisme à l'Exposition de la Section d'Or, Excelsior, 18 October 1912

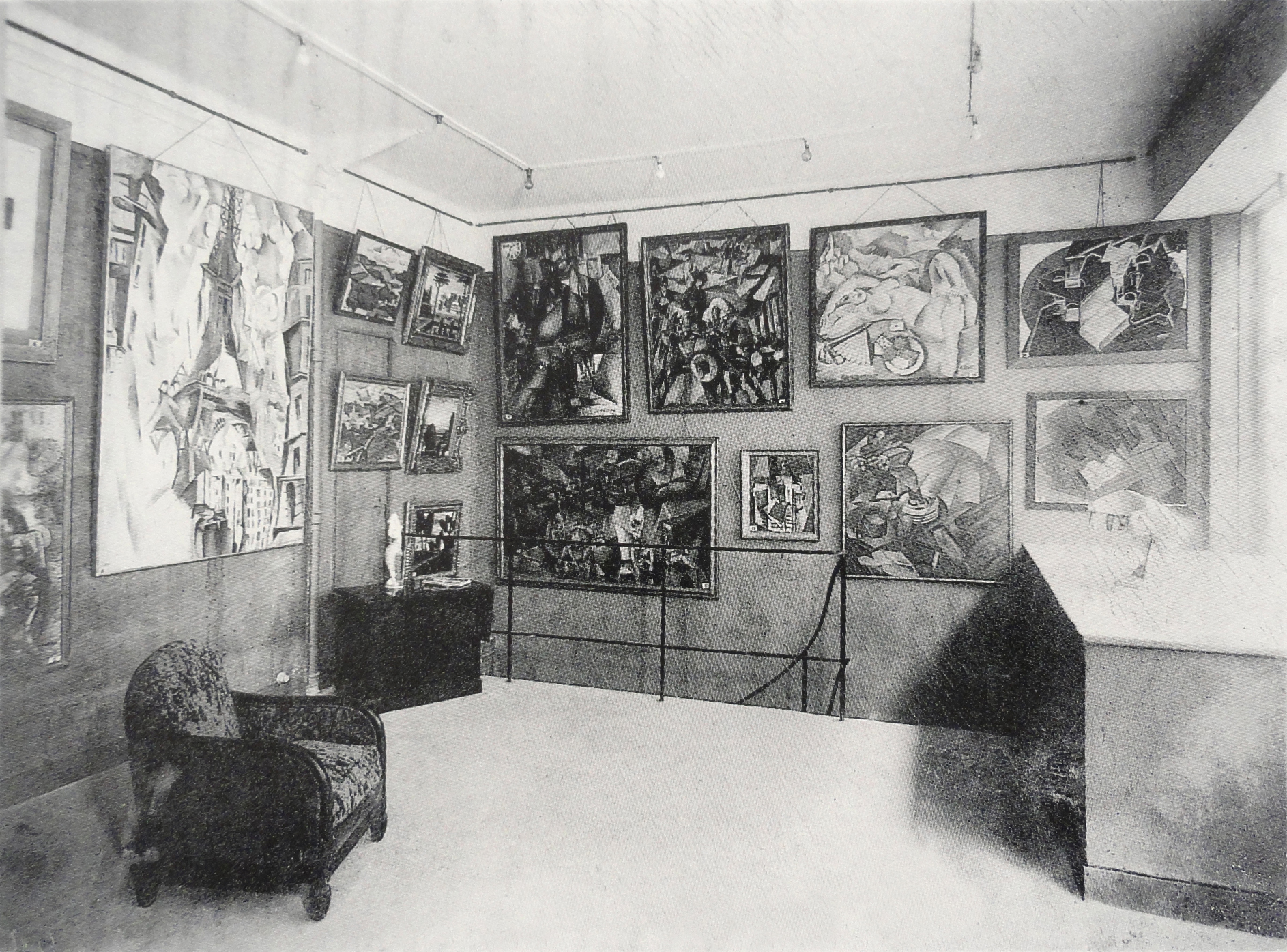
La Section d'Or exhibition, 1925, Galerie Vavin-Raspail, Paris. Albert Gleizes' Portrait de Eugène Figuière, La Chasse (The Hunt), and Les Baigneuses (The Bathers) are seen towards the center. Works by Robert Delaunay and André Lhote are seen to the left and right respectively, amidst works by others

The Section d'Or group founded by some of the most prominent Cubists was in effect an homage to Georges Seurat. Within the works by Seurat—of cafés, cabarets and concerts, of which the avant-garde were fond—the Cubists' rediscovered an underlying mathematical harmony: one that could easily be transformed into mobile, dynamical configurations. Whereas Cézanne had been influential to the development of Cubism between 1908 and 1911, during its most expressionistic phase, the work of Seurat would attract attention from the Cubists and Futurists between 1911 and 1914, when flatter geometric structures were being produced. What the Cubists found attractive, according to Apollinaire, was the manner in which Seurat asserted an absolute "scientific clarity of conception." The Cubists observed in his mathematical harmonies, geometric structuring of motion and form, the primacy of idea over nature (something the Symbolists had recognized). In their eyes, Seurat had "taken a fundamental step toward Cubism by restoring intellect and order to art, after Impressionism had denied them" (Robert Herbert, 1968).

The golden section does not govern Georges Seurat's Parade de Cirque (Circus Sideshow) geometric structure. Modern consensus is that Seurat never used the 'divine proportion'. Parade is divided horizontally into fourths and vertically into sixths. The 4 : 6 ratio corresponds to the dimensions of the canvas (one-half times wider than its vertical dimension). The ratio of Seurat's painting/stretcher corresponded to a ratio of 1 to 1.502, ± 0.002 (as opposed to the golden ratio of 1 to 1.618). The compositional axes in the painting correspond to basic mathematical divisions (simple ratios that appear to approximate the golden section).

== Section d'Or, 1920, 1925 ==
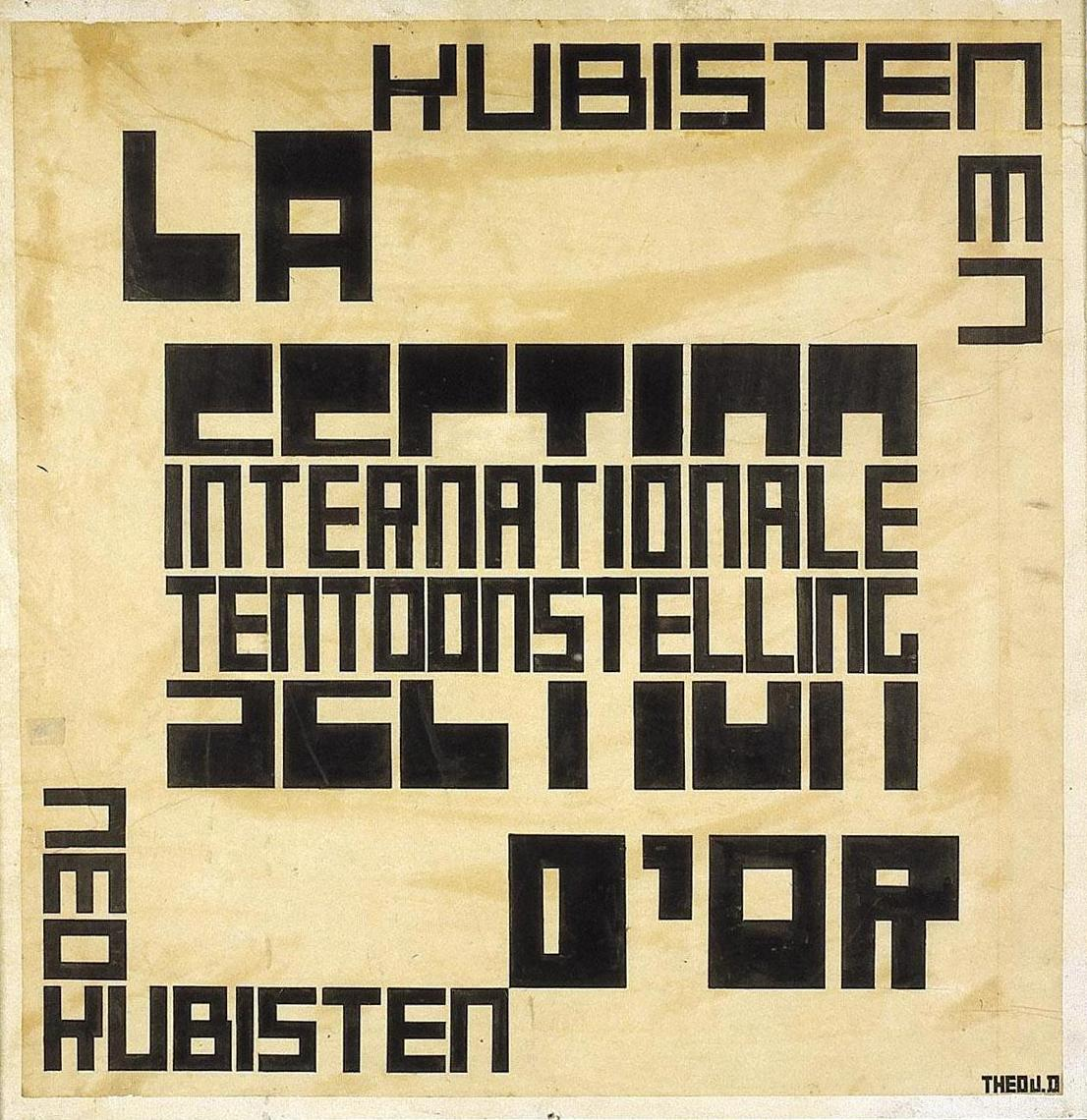
Theo van Doesburg. Design for an exhibition poster for La Section d'Or, c 1920. Ink on paper, 65 × 62,5 cm, Instituut Collectie Nederland

After World War I, with the support given by the dealer Léonce Rosenberg, Cubism returned as a central issue for artists. With the Salons dominated by a return to classicism, Albert Gleizes attempted to resuscitate the spirit of the Section d'Or in 1920 but was met with great difficulty, despite support by Fernand Léger, Alexander Archipenko, Georges Braque, Constantin Brâncuși, Henri Laurens, Jacques Villon, Raymond Duchamp-Villon, Louis Marcoussis and Léopold Survage. Gleizes' organizational efforts were directed towards the re-establishment of a European-wide movement of Cubist and abstract art in the form of a large traveling exhibition; the Exposition de la Section d’Or.

The idea was to bring together a collection of works that revealed the complete process of transformation and renewal that had taken place. It was not the success he had hoped for. Cubism was seen as passé for emerging artists and other established artists such as Marcel Duchamp and Picabia, although Gleizes, on the contrary, felt that only its preliminary phase had been investigated.

In addition to Cubists works (which already represented a wide variety of styles), the second edition of the Section d'Or held at the Galerie La Boétie from 5 March 1920 included De Stijl, Bauhaus, Constructivism and Futurism. It was the revival of the Section d'Or which ensured that Cubism in general would become Dada's preferred target. The new polemic resulted in the publication of Du cubisme et des moyens de le comprendre by Albert Gleizes, followed in 1922 by La Peinture et ses lois.

== Notable members ==
- Hélène Oettingen (François Angiboult), 1887–1950, French
- Alexander Archipenko, 1887–1964, Russian-Ukrainian
- Constantin Brâncuși, 1876–1957, Romanian
- Joseph Csaky, 1888–1971, Hungarian, naturalized French
- Alexandra Exter, 1882–1949, Russian-French
- Robert Delaunay, 1885–1941, French
- Marthe Donas, 1885–1967, Belgian
- Marcel Duchamp, 1887–1968, French
- Raymond Duchamp-Villon, 1876–1918, French
- Pierre Dumont, 1884–1936, French
- Alexandra Exter, 1882-1949, Russian-French
- Henri le Fauconnier, 1881–1946, French
- Roger de La Fresnaye, 1885–1925, French
- Albert Gleizes, 1881–1953, French
- Natalia Goncharova, 1881–1962, Russian
- Juan Gris, 1887–1927, Spanish
- František Kupka, 1871–1957, Czech
- Jean Lambert-Rucki, 1888–1967, Polish
- Marie-Thérèse Lanoa, 1887–1967, French
- Marie Laurencin, 1883–1956, French
- Fernand Léger, 1881–1955, French
- André Lhote, 1885–1962, French
- Jean Marchand, 1883–1940, French
- Louis Marcoussis, 1878–1941, Polish
- André Mare, 1885–1932, French
- Jean Metzinger, 1883–1956, French
- Francis Picabia, 1879–1953, French/Spanish
- Irène Reno (Rena Hassenberg), 1884–1953, French, Polish
- Georges Ribemont-Dessaignes, 1884–1974, French
- Jeanne Rij-Rousseau, 1870–1956, French
- André Dunoyer de Segonzac, 1884–1974, French
- Eugène Tirvert, 1881–1948, French
- Tobeen, 1880–1938, French
- Henry Valensi, 1883–1960, French
- Jacques Villon, 1875–1963, French

=== Collaborators ===
- Guillaume Apollinaire, 1880–1918, French, Italian, Polish
- Roger Allard, 1885–1961, French
- Gabrièle Buffet-Picabia, 1881–1985, French
- René Blum (ballet), 1878–1942, French
- Adolphe Basler, 1878–1949, French
- Marc Brésil, French
- Max Goth (Maximilien Gauthier), 1893–1977, French
- Olivier Hourcade, French
- Max Jacob, 1876–1944, French
- Pierre Müller, 1884–1914, French
- Jacques Nayral (Joseph Houot), ? 1914, French
- Maurice Princet, 1875–1973, French
- Maurice Raynal, 1884–1954, French
- Paul-Napoléon Roinard, 1856–1930, French
- Pierre Reverdy, 1889–1960, French
- André Salmon, 1881–1969, French
- Paul Villes, 1881-1977
- André Warnod, 1885–1960, French
- Francis Yard, 1876–1947, French

== See also ==
- Purism (arts)
- Orphism (art)
- Abstract art
- Crystal Cubism
