= The Bathers (Gleizes) =

Painting by Albert Gleizes

- Les Baigneuses (French)
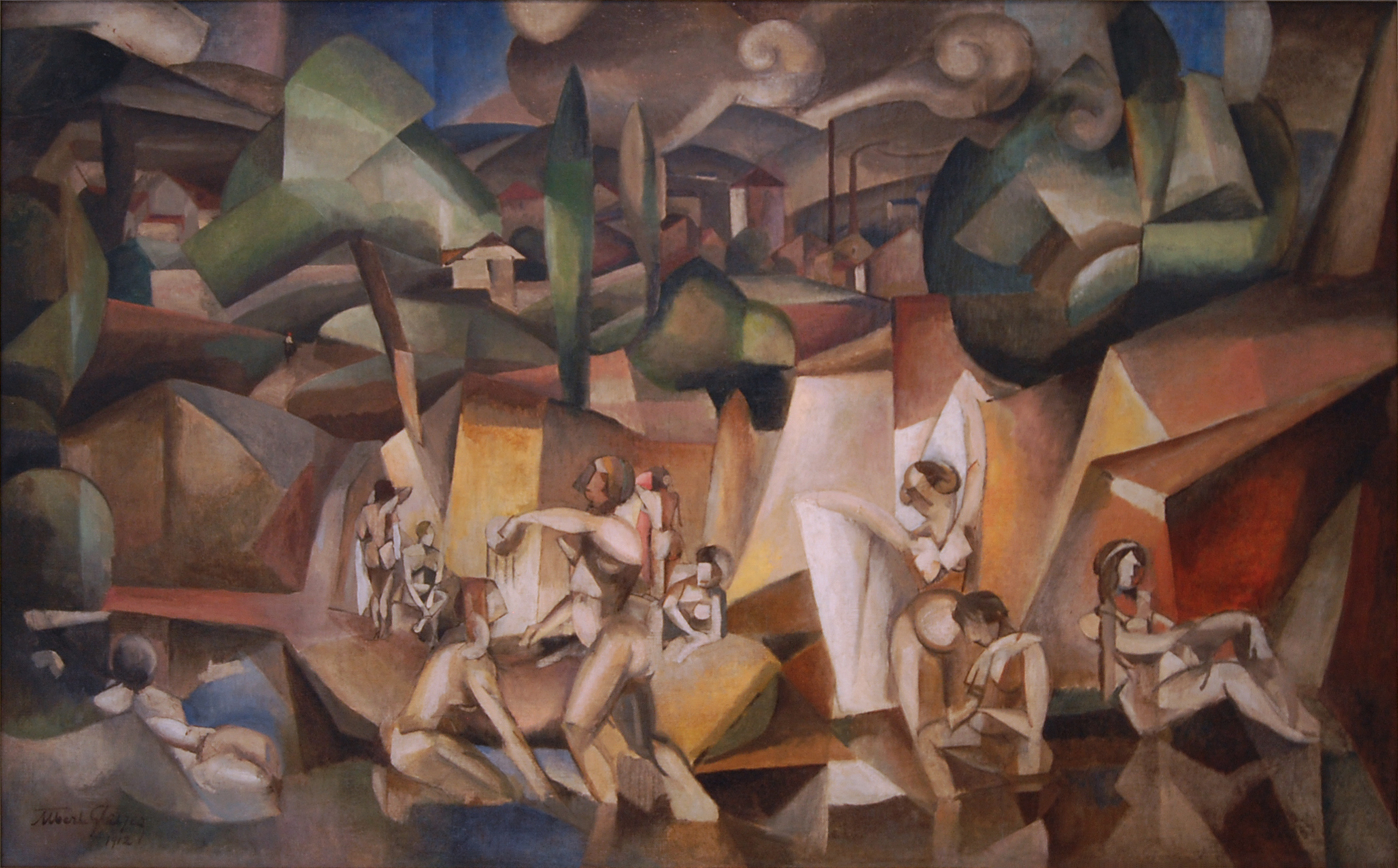
- Artist: Albert Gleizes
- Year: 1912
- Medium: Oil on canvas
- Dimensions: 105 cm × 171 cm (48.3 in × 67.3 in)
- Location: Musée d'Art Moderne de la Ville de Paris; Paris

The Bathers (French: Les Baigneuses) is a large oil painting created at the outset of 1912 by the French artist Albert Gleizes. It was exhibited at the Salon des Indépendants in Paris during the spring of 1912; the Salon de la Société Normande de Peinture Moderne, Rouen, summer 1912; and the Salon de la Section d'Or, autumn 1912. The painting was reproduced in Du "Cubisme", written by Albert Gleizes and Jean Metzinger the same year: the first and only manifesto on Cubism. Les Baigneuses, while still 'readable' in the figurative or representational sense, exemplifies the mobile, dynamic fragmentation of form and multiple perspective characteristic of Cubism at the outset of 1912. Highly sophisticated, both in theory and in practice, this aspect of simultaneity would soon become identified with the practices of the Section d'Or group. Gleizes deploys these techniques in "a radical, personal and coherent manner". Purchased in 1937, the painting is exhibited in the permanent collection of the Musée d'Art Moderne de la Ville de Paris.

== Description ==
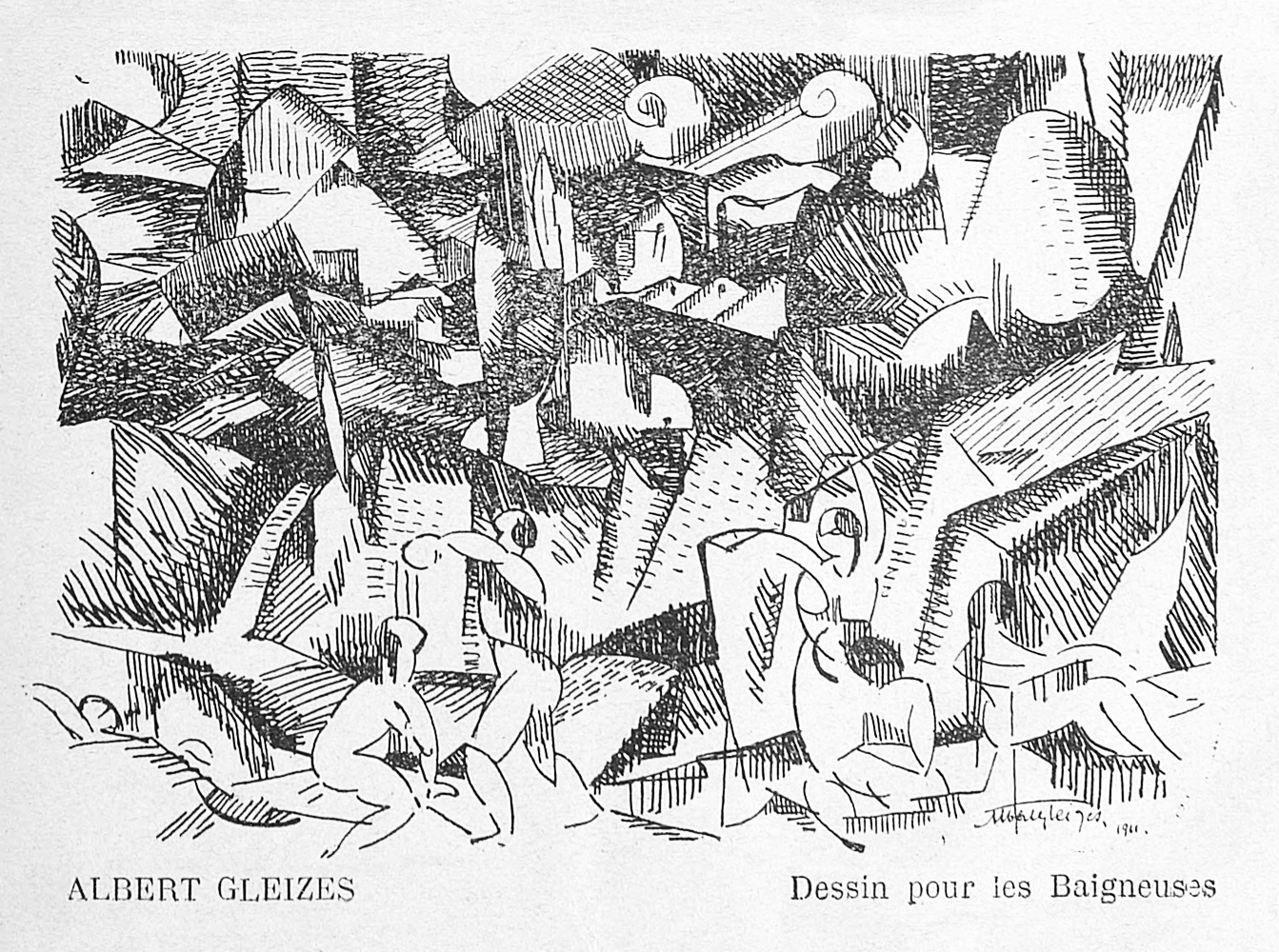
Albert Gleizes, 1911, Dessin pour les Baigneuses, published in La Revue de France et des pays français, February - March 1912

Les Baigneuses is an oil painting on canvas with dimensions 105 x 171 cm (41.3 by 67.3 inches), signed Albert Gleizes and dated 1912, lower left. This work, painted at the outset of 1912, represents a series of naked elegant women at various points in the landscape foreground, their reflections along with the blue of the sky echoing off the water at the lower edge of the canvas. Beyond the bathers can be observed protruding rock-like formations or boulders—with highlights of primary color—that appear to espouse elements of the foreground. Above these cliffs are found several deciduous woody plants of the genus Populus. Though native to many areas of the Northern Hemisphere, the Poplar, with its fastigiate branches tapered towards the top, is especially iconic of the western suburbs of Paris (la banlieue ouest) where Gleizes lived, 24 Avenue Gambetta, Courbevoie. The Gleizes family moved to Avenue Gambetta in 1887. Towards the end of the 19th century and extending through the early 20th century, Courbevoie witnessed a rapid growth in population, and a surge in the development of crafts, industry and transport (including rail). Such a scene of naked bathers actually occurring would have been highly unlikely in Courbevoie, or anywhere else near the Parisian capital.

=== Optimistic reconciliation ===
Les Baigneuses—as Robert Delaunay's 1912 City of Paris, and to some extent Jean Metzinger's 1913 Meudon Landscape—juxtaposes sharply contrasting elements. On the one hand the artist includes elements from a society in the process of inexorable industrialization, and on the other, the sereneness of timeless classical nude figures (something rarely painted by Gleizes, as Brooke points out). Yet the relationships between the two are formally resolved. This aspect of simultaneity—the optimistic reconciliation of classical tradition and contemporary life—was of particular interest to Gleizes, as it was to the Section d'Or group of Cubists (also known as the Passy group, or Puteaux group).

The background forms a semi-urban landscape that possesses both rural and semi-industrial components, consistent with Courbevoie of the 1910s (except perhaps for the rock-like outcrops), a village or town with delicate smokestacks or factory chimneys billowing smoke that blends into the cloudy sky. Evidence that factories were already located on the Seine can be seen in Gleizes' Péniches et fumées à Courbevoie of 1908. The statuesque nudes themselves are highly stylized, divided into geometrized facets, planes and curves, yet they are graceful, balletic and elegant. The source of light, rather than beaming down from one particular direction, appears to emanate from within the canvas itself, with an intensification in the vicinity of the bathers.

Albert Gleizes, 1912, Les Baigneuses, The Bathers, (left) vs. Courbevoie, postcard ca.1912, Les Bord de Seine, L'Ile de la Jatte (right). The Île de la Jatte (or Île de la Grande Jatte) is an island over which Gleizes would have passed on his way to and from the center of Paris. The island is well known as the setting for Georges Seurat's A Sunday Afternoon on the Island of La Grande Jatte (1884), and his Bathers at Asnières, in the background of which smoke emanating from industrial factories of Clichy can be observed; just as in Gleizes' Baigneuses

Gleizes painted L'île de la Jatte many times since 1901 and on at least five occasions between 1907 and 1912:

- 1907–1909, L'île de la Grande Jatte ou Bord de parc avec rivière animée de canots, pastel pierre noire and ink on bistre paper, 25 × 41.5 cm, private collection
- 1908, Péniches et fumées à Courbevoie, Crayon, ink and gouache on paper, 23 x 32.5 cm, Fondation Albert Gleizes (Paris)
- 1908, L'île de la Grande Jatte, fusain and gouache on rose paper, 25 × 41.5 cm, Musée national d'art moderne (Paris)
- 1908, La Seine près de Courbevoie, oil on canvas, 54 × 65 cm, Musée Roybet Fould (Courbevoie)
- 1908, Barque à Courbevoie, fusain and chalk on paper, 30 x 38 cm, art market (Paris)

The subject matter of Les Baigneuses, much as that of his monumental Harvest Threshing of the same year, is derived from an unsentimental observation of the world.

Gleizes' interest centered on many things in the years leading up to 1912, one of which was the dynamic qualities of modern urban life. Les Baigneuses, depicts "a harmonious and balanced landscape in which industrial and urban elements are imbricated with the surrounding countryside;" writes Cottington in Cubism in the Shadow of War, "Poussinesque in its organizing geometry and Claudian in its specificity of place, this is the landscape not of Arcadia but of France as Gleizes wished it to be." Gleizes' formal innovations seen in this work are more closely related to the Salon Cubists (Jean Metzinger, Robert Delaunay, Henri Le Fauconnier and Fernand Léger) than to those of the Gallery Cubists (Pablo Picasso and Georges Braque).

The gestures of the bathers in the 'foreground' and the whirls of chimney-smoke in the 'background' are unified expressively through "a timeless and purportedly natural order." While the subject was "explicit in its reference to latinist classicism" writes Cottington, "and implicit in its rejection of the avant-gardist challenge of the futurists to avoid the pictorial representation of the nude as inescapably passé", he continues, "the presence of emblems of industrialization, not juxtaposed but integrated with the rhythms of the landscape, marked a definite, if tentative, departure from the concerns he had shared with Le Fauconnier." Gleizes made use of fragmentation of form, multiple perspective views (i.e., mobile and dynamic, rather than static and from one point-of-view) along with linear and planar structural qualities. Though highly sophisticated in theory, this aspect of simultaneity would actually become quite commonly employed within the practices of the Section d'Or group. Gleizes deployed these techniques in "a radical, personal and coherent manner" (Cottington, 1998).

== 1912 ==
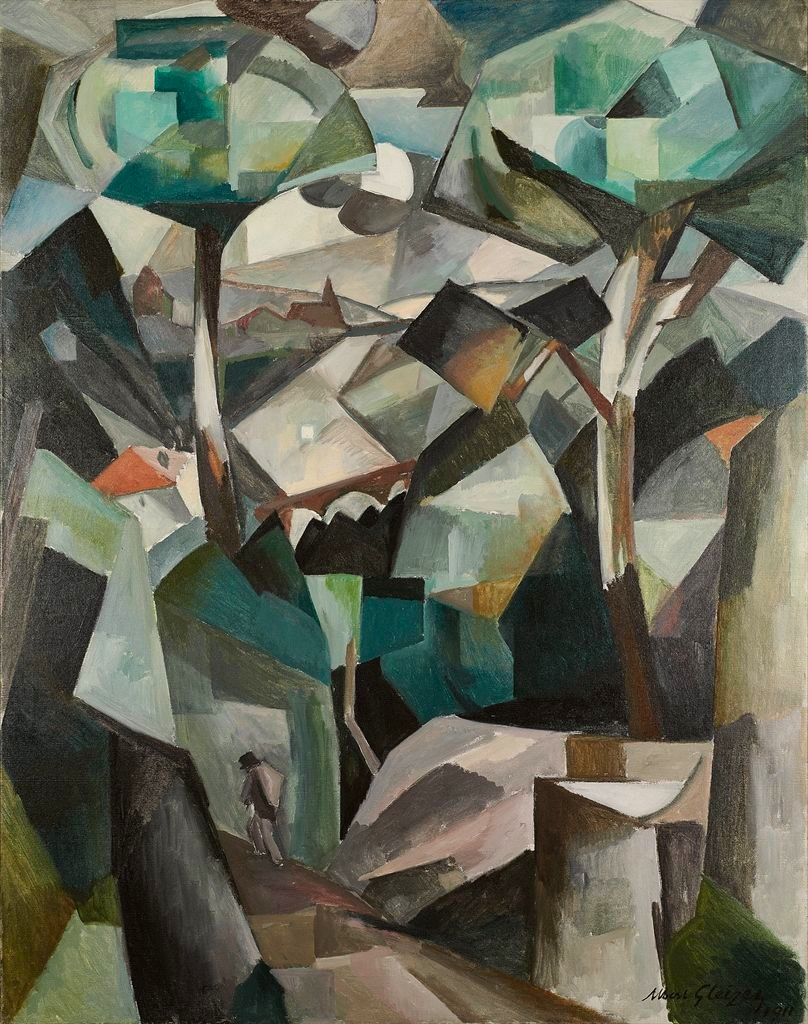
Albert Gleizes, 1911, Le Chemin, Paysage à Meudon, Paysage avec personnage, oil on canvas, 146.4 x 114.4 cm. Exhibited at Salon des Indépendants, Paris, 1911, Salon des Indépendants, Brussels, 1911, Galeries Dalmau, Barcelona, 1912, Galerie La Boétie, Salon de La Section d'Or, 1912, stolen by Nazi occupiers from the home of collector Alphonse Kann during World War II, returned to its rightful owners in 1997

For Gleizes and those of his entourage 1912 signified a climax in the debates centering around modernism and classicism – Bergson and Nietzsche – Euclid and Riemann – nationalism and regionalism – Poincaré and four-dimensional space. It was precisely during 1912 that Gleizes and Metzinger would write the seminal treatise Du "Cubisme" (Cubism's only manifesto), in an attempt "to put a little order into the chaos of everything that had been written in the papers and reviews since 1911", to use the words of Gleizes.

It was both as artists and theorists (in painting and writing) that Gleizes and Metzinger expressed their critical and ideological discourse about the possible meanings and significance of Cubism and contemporary aesthetics. Indeed, Du "Cubisme" was much more than an unorthodox or anti-academic explanation of the avant-gardist innovations seen in Cubist paintings.

It was natural that Gleizes and Metzinger, both articulate men, should come not just to theorize on the meaning of Cubism, but to defend the movement against attacks leveled in the wake of the 1911 public exhibitions. The two had exhibited regularly at the important salons (Salon d'Automne and Salon des Indépendants) since around 1903 and held divers official positions within them (e.g., hanging committee members). Both were well-versed in philosophy, mathematics and poetry. While Metzinger had participated in discussions at the Bateau Lavoir (from 1907), both he and Gleizes were largely responsible for the impression made by the Cubists on the general public during both the Salon des Indépendants and Salon d'Automne of 1910 and 1911 respectively. Intellectual and moral support for their endeavors came from members of the Section d'Or (Groupe de Puteaux).

In contrast, Picasso and Braque remained unknown to the general public and made no recorded statements during the crucial pre-War period. Braque's first brief aphoristic statement regarding Cubism was written in 1917 during his gradual return to health following a head-wound during the war. Picasso's first recorded statement on Cubism is dated 1923, at a time when Dada, Surrealism and Abstract art had become fashionable.

By 1912 art had become much more than a dialogue between artist and nature. "The three dimensions of sensorial volume", Gleizes would write in 1925, "left open the field for the introduction of the time factor".

"The diversity of the relations of line to line must be indefinite;" write Gleizes and Metzinger, "on this condition it incorporates quality, the incommensurable sum of the affinities perceived between that which we discern and that which pre-exists within us: on this condition a work of art is able to move us".

== Cézanne ==
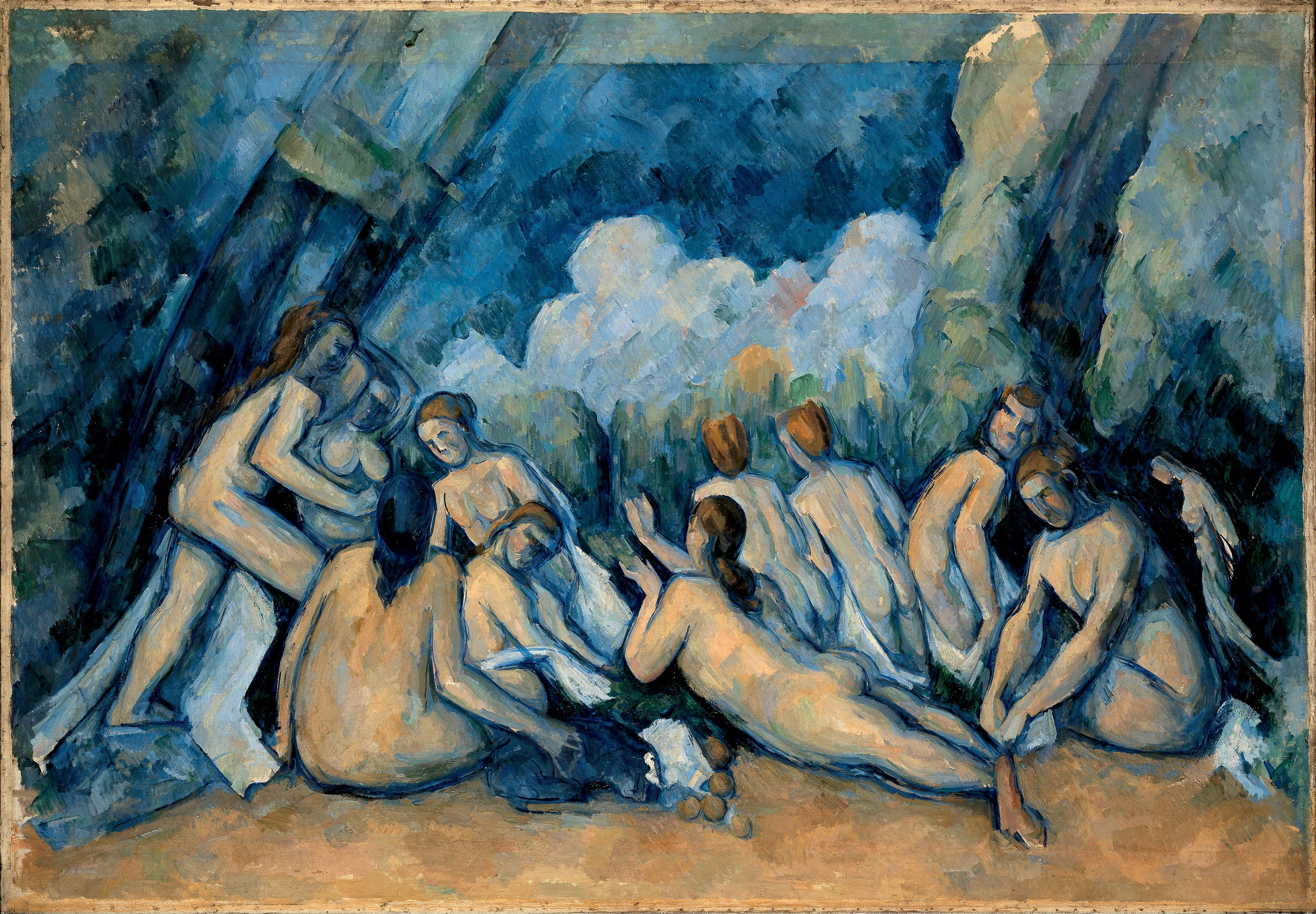
Paul Cézanne, Bathers (Les Grandes Baigneuses), 1894–1905, oil on canvas, 127.2 × 196.1 cm. National Gallery, London

Cézanne, progressively leading up to 1906, moved away from classic pictorial arrangements, single view perspectives, and outlines that enclosed color. His attempt was to arrive at a "lived perspective" by capturing all the complexities that could be observed with the eye and captured by the senses, where both "sight" and "touch" became one. Cézanne believed his paintings could capture a moment in time, that once passed it was gone, that art and nature are the same. Cézanne claimed: "Art is a personal apperception, which I embody in sensations and which I ask the understanding to organize into a painting." The true meaning of painting grew closer as the distance from tradition increased. Just as the Cubists he would inspire, Cézanne had little interest in the rational naturalistic painting and classical geometrical perspective inherited from the Renaissance. "Nor was he satisfied," writes Merleau-Ponty, "with the attempts of the Impressionists to dissolve this objective order into its original elements of light and atmosphere".[sic]

== Staticity and dynamism ==
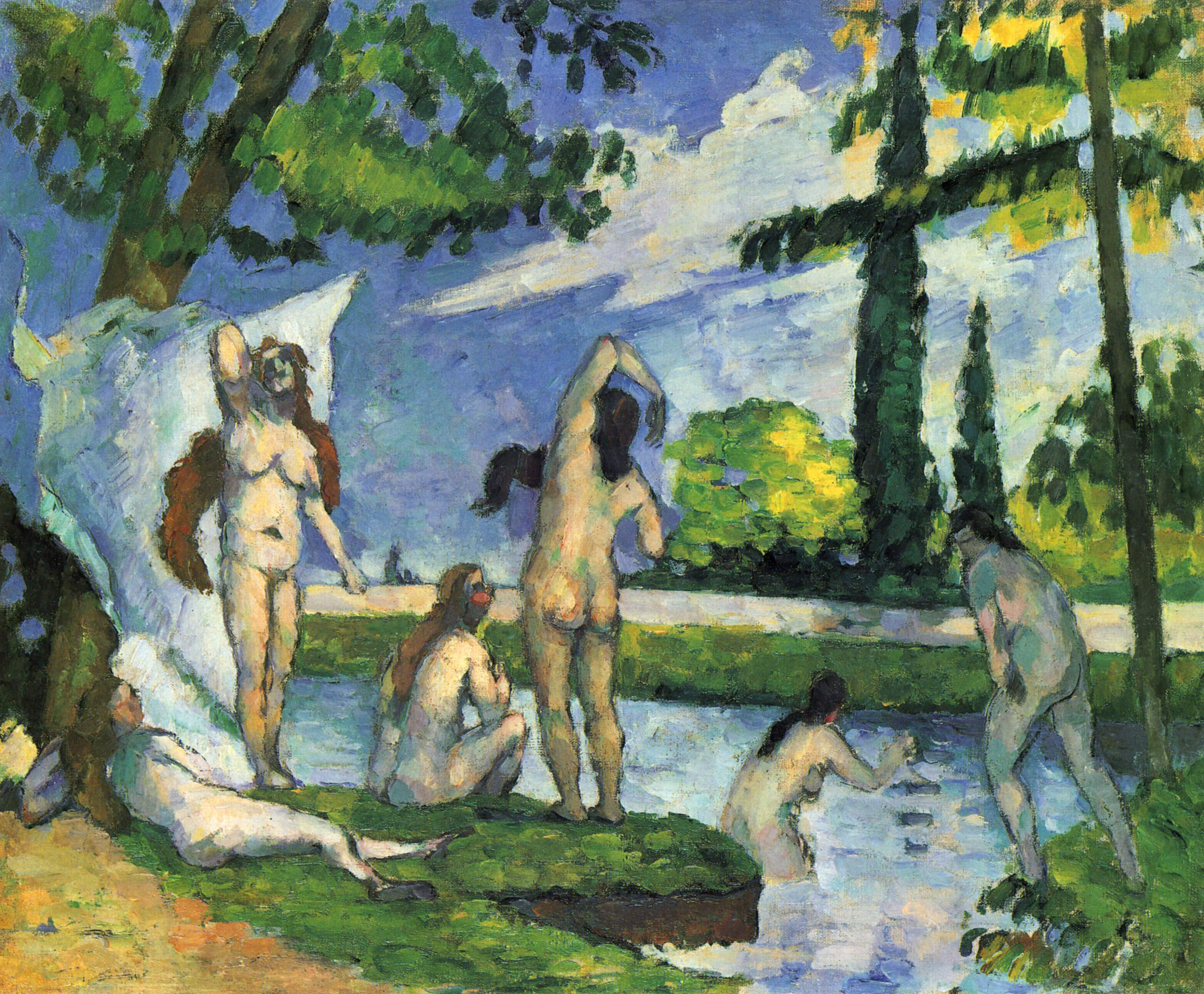
Paul Cézanne, Bathers, 1874–1875, oil on canvas, 38.1 × 46 cm (15 × 18.1 in), Metropolitan Museum of Art, New York City

The preoccupations of Gleizes, to considerable extent beyond those emancipated by Cézanne, was to play with the mobile, dynamic, changing aspects of the same form relative to the position of the painter.

Les Baigneuses, along with other compositions by Gleizes and his fellow Salon Cubists from this period (1911-1912), tend to coordinate a variety of views of the same subject, or a multiplicity (in the Bergsonian sense) of different angles in one picture. This attempt clearly shows the importance of both the time element and the mobile properties in the sequence of events. According to Gleizes, the artist would accommodate either several successive moments in time projected onto a single space, or multiple spaces projected onto the canvas at the same time. These kinematic compositions that took into account both staticity and dynamism were not just a new description of the external world created by the artist, but also the inner world.

Paintings of the Renaissance could not entirely convey these aspects of the world since their subjects were immobilized in a depiction based on one unique point of view; but the real world better corresponds to multiplicity of vision (we have two eyes). And here is precisely where an ambiguity or uncertainty arises as regards interpretation. This period was in fact marked by the unification of disparate concepts. Classical perspective and non-Euclidean geometry were not, after all, incompatible with one another.

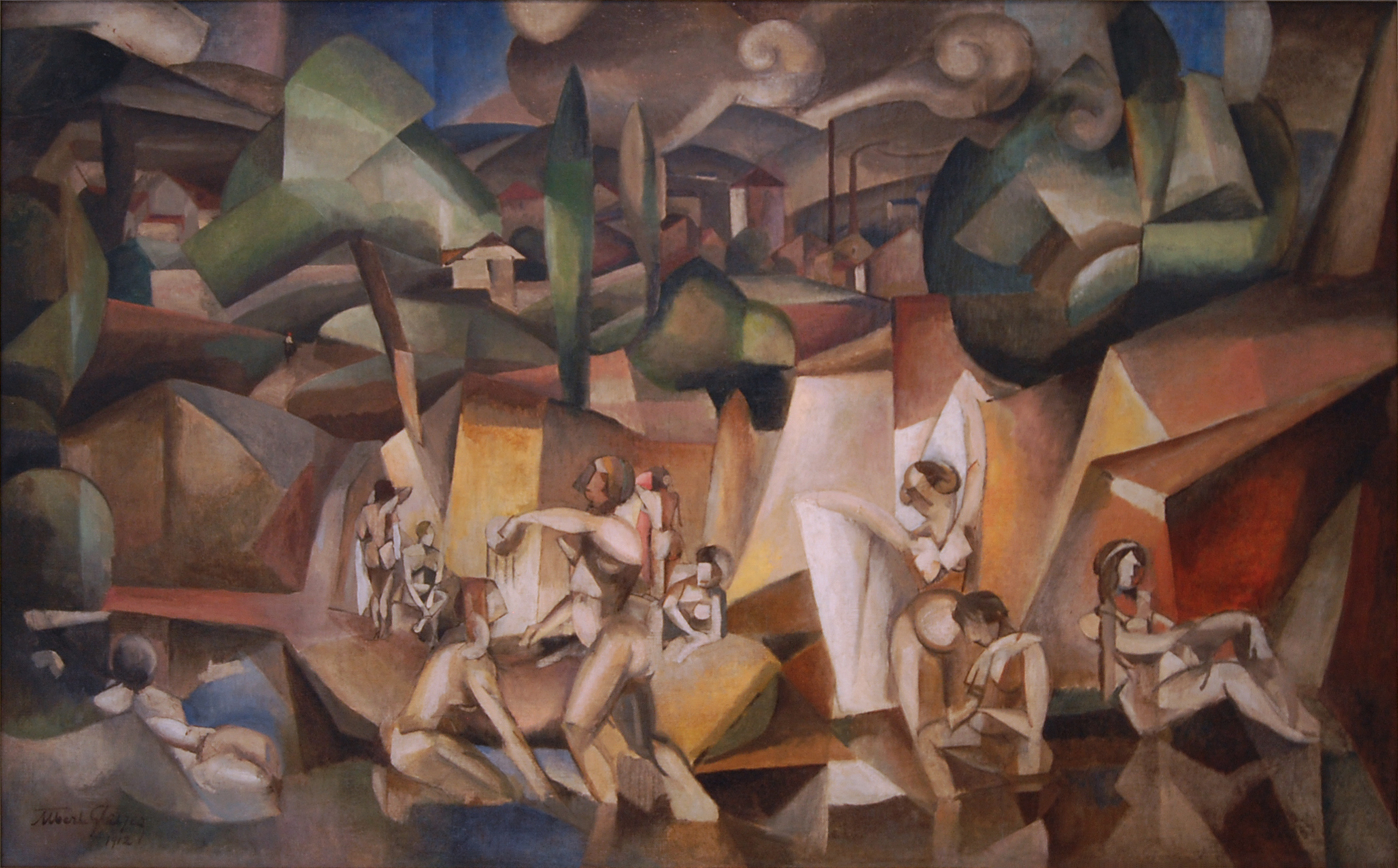
Albert Gleizes, 1912, Les Baigneuses

Eadweard Muybridge, 1887, Animal Locomotion, Plate 187, Dancing, fancy, no. 12, Miss Larrigan

Eadweard Muybridge, 1887, Animal locomotion. Plate 413, Woman washing, Collotypes; Motion study photographs

The former was simply viewed as a special case contained within a more general concept. Reconciliation between the static classical and modern mobile approach was attainable since within the representation of successive states of an event could be found repeated images fixed for all time (as in the overlapping of several static images). Just as the dynamism of a motion picture results from a succession of still shots, the Cubists stance expounded by Gleizes and Metzinger on theoretical and plastic fronts, consisted of capturing the subject matter or object in a series of 'still shots' (static images) and suturing them together (i.e., several successive moments in time projected onto a single space). Likewise, or alternatively, the artist could depict (multiple spaces projected onto the canvas simultaneously).

There is a subtle difference or distinction between these two types of simultaneity Gleizes describes that deserve closer attention: inscribed onto the canvas could be either (1) the properties of two or more instantiations or physical occurrence happening at the same time from the point of view of one frame of reference (the artist fixed in one position), or (2) the artist could inscribe (paint) the properties of one event represented over a succession of time intervals, observed from several frame of reference (or multiple points of view simultaneously expressed onto the canvas), meaning that the observational reference frame is tied to the state of motion of an observer. There are shared variables between the two concepts, involving the flow of time, i.e., temporal in nature, and involving motion (on the part of either the artist or subject), spatial in nature.

This cinématique nomenclature offered to the spectator several views of an isolated event, of the same subject, or similarly, several different subjects, a series of events, observed from one point of view. No longer was the artist restricted to a principle (or set of principles). The liberation from academicism offered by Cubism, as instigated by Cézanne, resulted from the fact that the artist was no longer restricted to the representation of the subject (or the world) as seen in a photograph. No longer restricted to the imitative description of nature, and despite the complexification of visual stimuli (many views instead of one), the technique of painting became simple and direct.

In 1912 the photographic motion studies of Eadweard Muybridge and Étienne-Jules Marey particularly interested artists of the Section d'Or, including Jean Metzinger, Marcel Duchamp and Albert Gleizes. A predecessor to cinematography and moving film, chronophotography involved a series or succession of different images, originally created and used for the scientific study of movement. These chronophotographs included a series of dancers and women washing. Though Gleizes may not have seen these specific photographs he was likely interested in the same idea, as were the Futurists. The motion picture with its cinematic techniques was developing too at the time.

There is also a scientifique nomenclature offered to the spectator (the relativity of simultaneity), that artists themselves, art critics and art historians have not failed to notice. Some have attempted to refute such connections and others have embraced them. Though the name Einstein was not yet a household word in 1912, there has been a rapprochement of the concept of multiplicity described above and the concept of relativity in the Einsteinian sense. While, as Einstein writes, the physicist can generally limit herself to one system of coordinates for the description of physical reality, the Cubist (particularly Gleizes and Metzinger) attempted to show the simultaneity of several such views, or, at the very least, they were unwilling to commit themselves to a single coordinate system.

== Salon des Indépendants, 1912 ==
At the 1912 Salon des Indépendants Albert Gleizes exhibited Les Baigneuses (no. 1347) — Marcel Duchamp's Nu descendant l'escalier was listed in the catalogue (n. 1001) but was supposedly withdrawn — Roger de La Fresnaye exhibited Artillerie (no. 1235) — Robert Delaunay showed his monumental Ville de Paris (no. 868) — Jean Metzinger exhibited La Femme au Cheval (Woman with a horse) and Le Port — Fernand Léger showed La Noce — Henri Le Fauconnier, Le Chasseur (The Huntsman) — and the newcomer Juan Gris exhibited his Portrait of Picasso.

The art critic Olivier-Hourcade writes of this exhibition in 1912 and its relation to the creation of a new French school: 'Metzinger with his Port, Delaunay with Paris, Gleizes with his Baigneuses, are close to this real and magnificent result, this victory comes from several centuries: the creation of a school of painting, 'French' and absolutely independent.

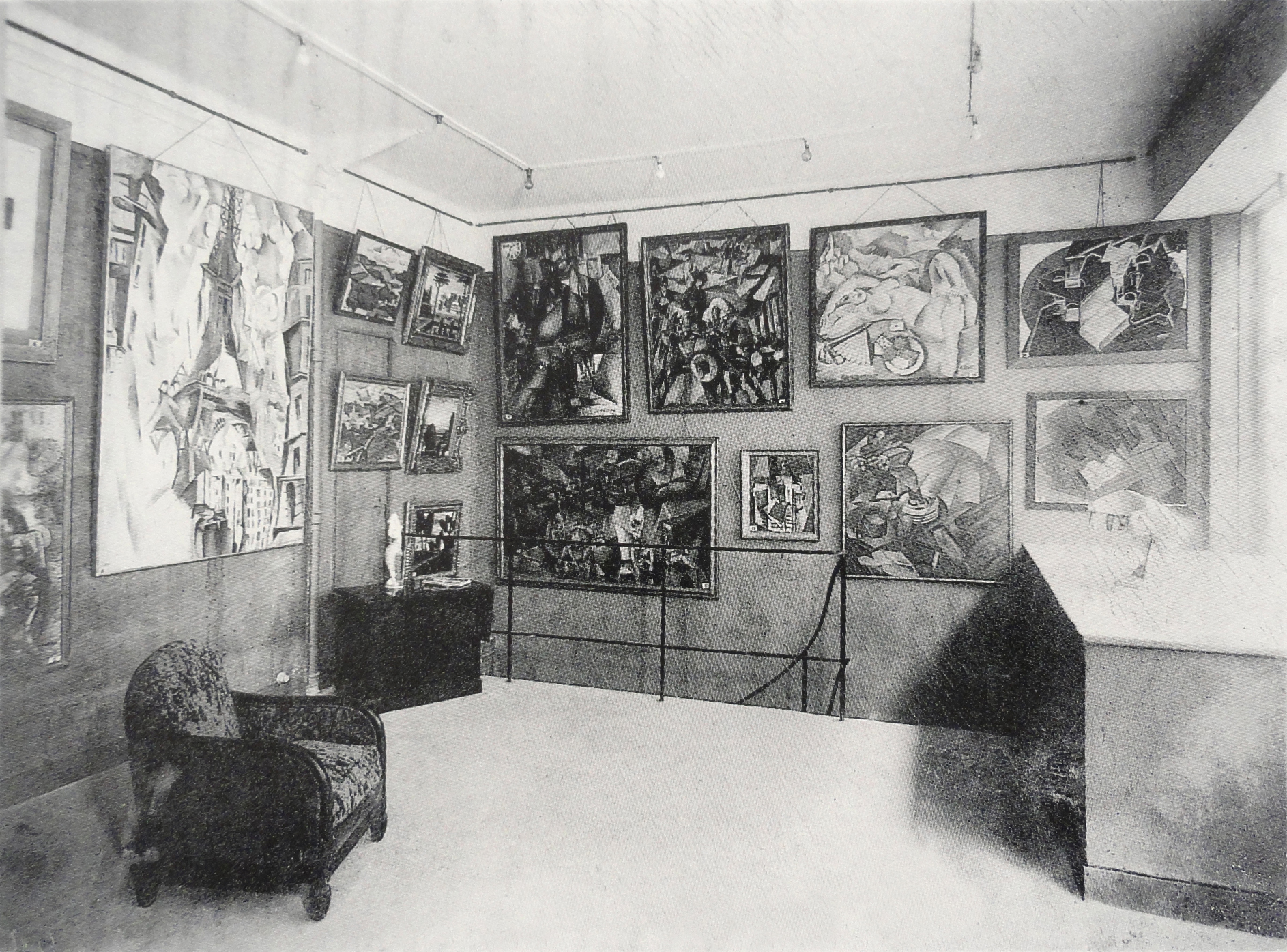
La Section d'Or exhibition, 1925, Galerie Vavin-Raspail, Paris. Gleizes' Portrait de Eugène Figuière, La Chasse (The Hunt), and Les Baigneuses are seen towards the center

Gleizes, on the other hand, would write the following year (1913) of the movements continual evolution:

The changes it had already undergone since the Indépendants of 1911 could leave people in no doubt as to its nature. Cubism was not a school, distinguished by some superficial variation on a generally accepted norm. It was a total regeneration, indicating the emergence of a wholly new cast of mind. Every season it appeared renewed, growing like a living body. Its enemies could, eventually, have forgiven it if only it had passed away, like a fashion; but they became even more violent when they realised that it was destined to live a life that would be longer than that of those painters who had been the first to assume the responsibility for it.

"Never had a crowd been seen thrown into such a turmoil by works of the spirit, and especially over esemplastic works, paintings, whose nature it is to be silent", writes Albert Gleizes, "Never had the critics been so violent as they were at that time. From which it became clear that these paintings—and I specify the names of the painters who were, alone, the reluctant causes of all this frenzy: Jean Metzinger, Henri Le Fauconnier, Fernand Léger, Robert Delaunay and myself—appeared as a threat to an order that everyone thought had been established forever."

== Exhibitions ==
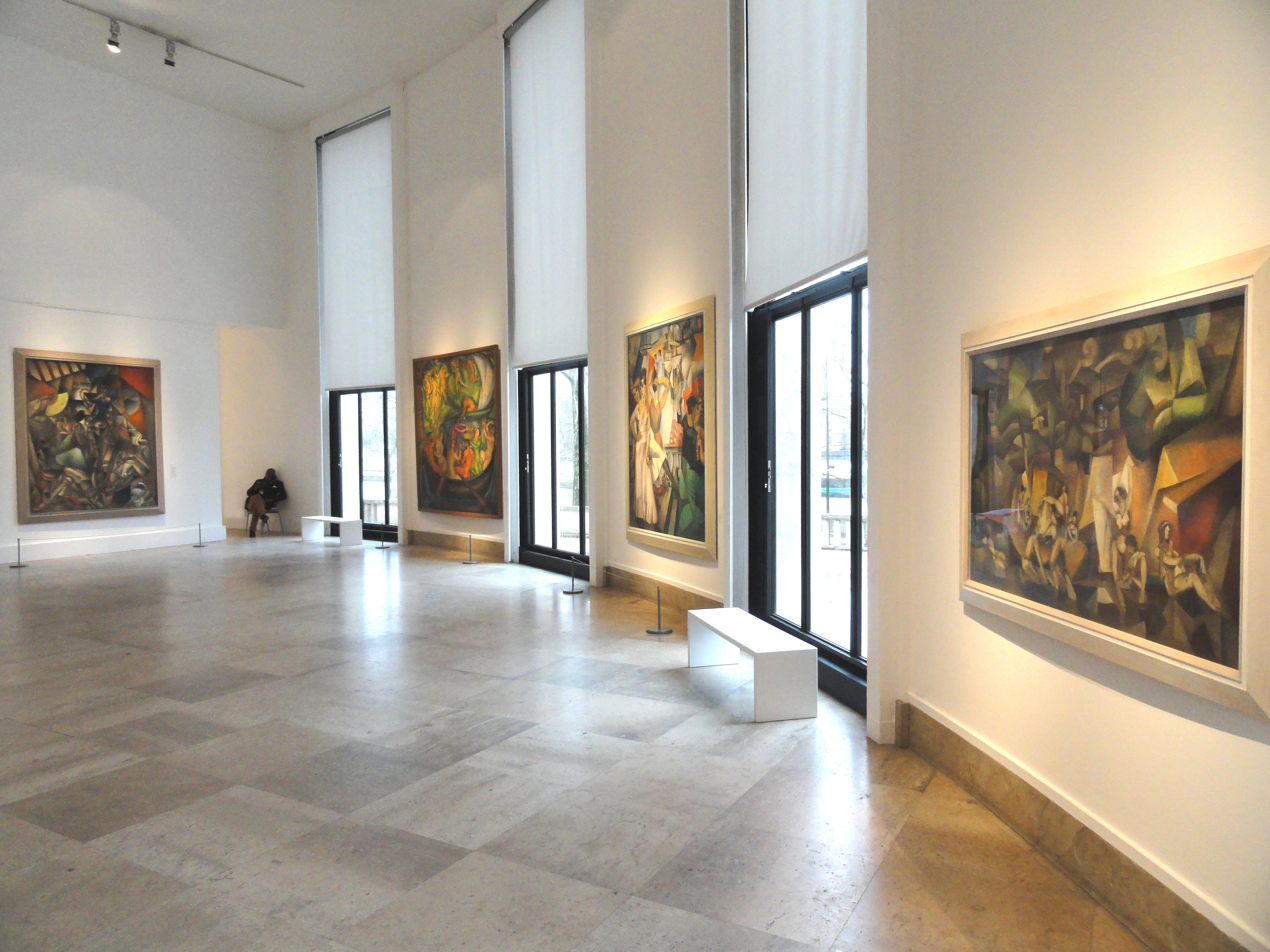
Jean Metzinger, L'Oiseau Bleu (left), André Lhote, two works (center), Albert Gleizes, Baigneuses (right), Musée d'Art Moderne de la Ville de Paris, March 2014

- Salon des Indépendants, Paris, 1912, no. 1347.
- Salon de la Section d'Or, Galerie La Boétie in Paris, October 1912, no. 40.
- Exposition de Cubistes Français, Musée Rath, Geneva, 3–15 June 1913, no. 8
- Moderni Umeni, S.V.U. Mánes, Prague, 1914, no. 36.
- La Section d'Or exhibition, 1925, Galerie Vavin-Raspail, Paris
- Salon des Indépendants, Trente Ans d'Art Indépendants, 1884–1914, Grand Palais, Paris, 1926, no. 1057.
- Les créateurs du cubisme: Galerie Wildenstein, Paris, 1935, no. 31.
- Les Maitres de I'Art Indépendants 1895-1937, Petit Palais, Paris, 1937, no. 6.
- Albert Gleizes 1881 – 1953, A Retrospective Exhibition, The Solomon R. Guggenheim Foundation, New York, Musée National d'Art Moderne, Paris, Museum am Ostwall, Dortmund, 1964-1965 (no. 31).
- Le cubisme, 17 October 2018 – 25 February 2019, Galerie 1, Centre Pompidou, Musée National d'Art Moderne, Paris. Kunstmuseum Basel, 31 March – 5 August 2019

== Literature ==
- Albert Gleizes and Jean Metzinger, Du "Cubisme", published by Eugène Figuière, Paris, 1912, translated to English and Russian in 1913
- Apollinaire, g. Le Petit Bleu, March 20, 1912 (cf. Chroniques d'Art, 1960, p. 230).
- Bonfante, E. and Ravenna, J. Arte Cubista con "les Meditations Esthetiques sur la Peinture" di Guillaume Apollinaire, Venice, 1945, no. LVIII.
- Musee d'Art Moderne de la Ville de Paris, Catalogue-Guide, Paris, 1961.
- Robbins, Daniel, Albert Gleizes 1881 – 1953, A Retrospective Exhibition, Published by The Solomon R. Guggenheim Foundation, New York, in collaboration with Musée National d'Art Moderne, Paris, Museum am Ostwall, Dortmund, 1964 (catalogue no. 31).
- Varichon, Anne, Daniel Robbins, Albert Gleizes – Catalogue Raisonné, Volume 1, Paris, Somogy éditions d'art/Fondation Albert Gleizes, 1998, ISBN 2-85056-286-6.

== See also ==
- List of works by Albert Gleizes
