= Marthe Donas =

Belgian painter (1885 –1967)

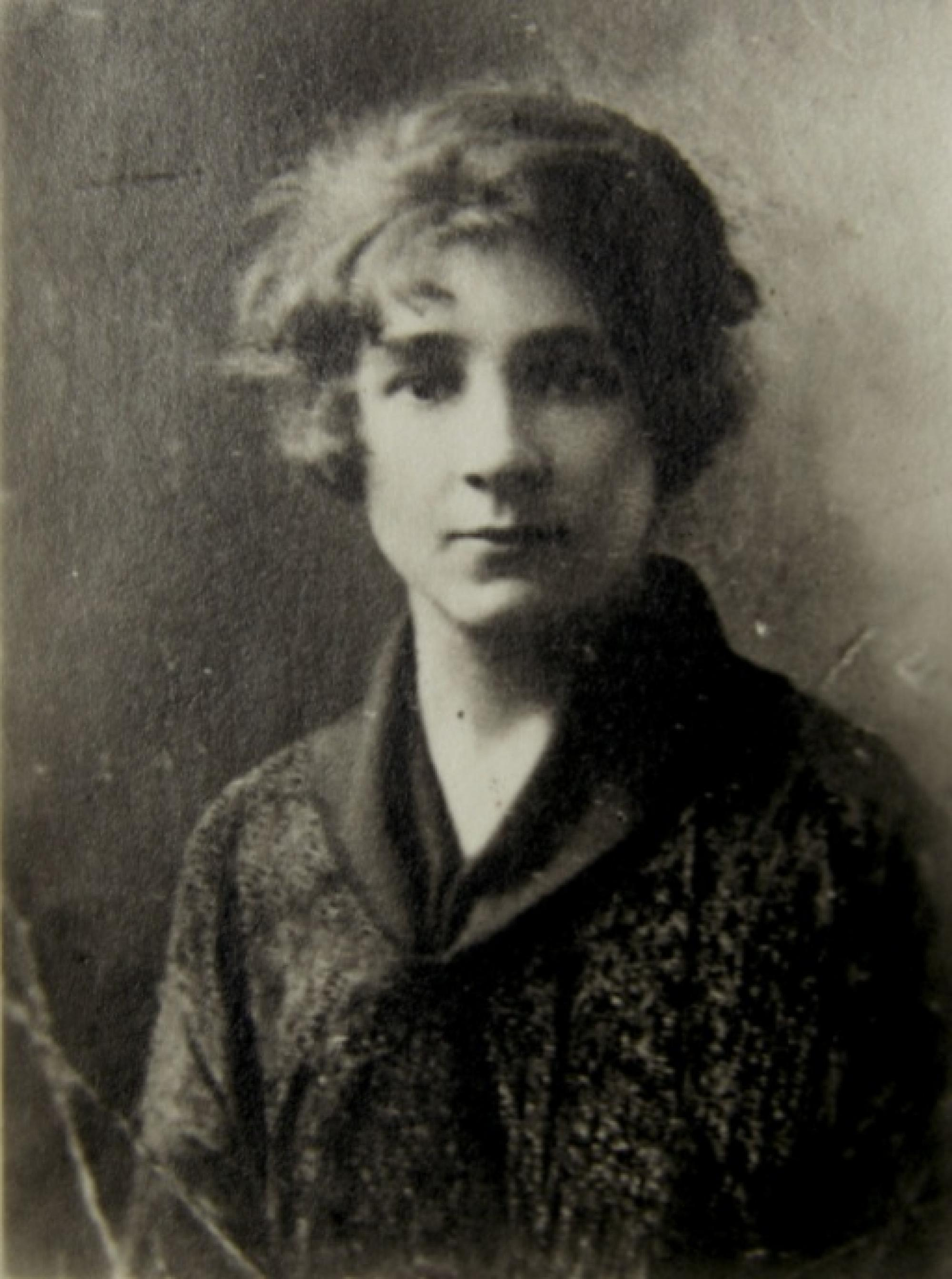
- Born: October 26, 1885; Antwerp, Belgium
- Died: January 31, 1967 (aged 81); Audregnies, Belgium
- Education: Royal Academy of Fine Arts Antwerp
- Known for: Painting
- Movement: Abstract art, Cubism
- Website: www.marthedonas.be

Marthe Donas (26 October 1885 – 31 January 1967) was a Belgian abstract and cubist painter and is recognized as one of the leading figures of Modernism. Donas worked under the androgynous pseudonyms Tour d'Onasky, Tour Donas and M. Donas.

== Biography ==
=== Early life ===
Born on 26 October 1885, Marthe Gabrielle Donas grew up in Antwerp as the daughter of a prosperous French-speaking bourgeois family. On her own initiative, she enrolled at the Royal Academy of Fine Arts Antwerp at the age of seventeen. Her authoritarian father, however, did not support her wish to become a painter, preventing her from going to drawing class and exhibitions and would not allow her being in contact with other students and artists in Antwerp. Donas' paintings at that time were confined to still lifes and portraits of her family and friend circle. Against her father's will, she re-enrolled at the Higher Institute of Fine Arts in 1912 following the course for young ladies with Frans Van Kuyck.

=== Beginning of her artistic career in Dublin ===
After the breakout of the First World War and the German invasion of Belgium, 4 August 1914, the Donas family fled to Goes, Netherlands. Soon after, Donas freed herself from the family pressure and moved with one of her sisters to Dublin. There, she continued perfecting her drawing, painting and print-making skills and followed a course in stained-glass art. At the end of 1915, she was taken on at Sarah Purser’s stained-glass art studio An Tur Gloine where she produced three large stained-glass windows for churches as well as some smaller works. Due to the political events surrounding the Easter Rising in Dublin in 1916, she once again was forced to leave her place of residence. While her sister sailed back to the family to the Netherlands, Marthe decided not to return to her old life but to head for Paris instead, at the time the artistic centre of Europe.

=== Arrival in Paris ===
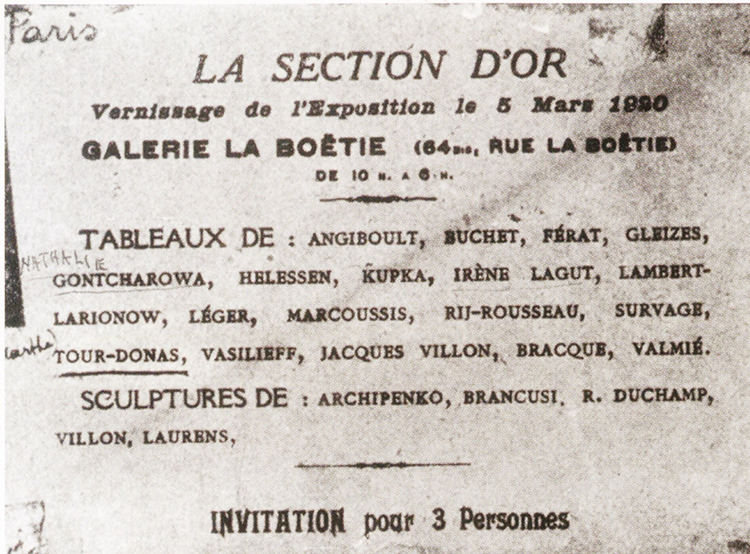
Invitation to the opening of the exhibition La Section d'Or, Galerie La Boëtie, Paris on 5 March 1920

She settled in Montparnasse at the end of 1916 and rented a studio in a large complex at 9 Rue Campagne Première. It was in Paris where she got into touch with the latest artistic movements. She continued her education at the Académies de la Grande Chaumière and Ranson. In January 1917 she discovered the work of André Lhote and Cubism, which left a deep impression on her. Donas soon became Lhote's pupil and started to adapt a cubist style in her own paintings.

=== With Archipenko in Nice ===
Still Life with Bottle and Cup (1917) at the Yale University Art Gallery (catalog number 1941.429)

Due to her precarious financial situation Donas accepted the offer of an aristocratic lady to join her to the South of France in exchange for painting lessons. In spring 1917 she moved to Nice where she met the Ukrainian sculptor Alexander Archipenko. They developed not only an intensive collaboration in their artistic work but also an intimate personal relationship. Donas' paintings and drawings of that time show how skilfully she incorporated elements of Archipenko's sculpto-paintings in a highly personal way. She then worked fully in a cubist manner, further developing her remarkable sense of colour under Archipenko's influence. Her most recurring motive was the female figure and still lives. By including concave and convex forms, alternating between round, angular and blurred elements, she introduced energy and investigated movement in her paintings which became more and more abstract. Already in Paris, she had experimented with collage techniques, but in Nice regularly incorporated materials like cement, sand, different kinds of fabric and lace, sandpaper and wallpapers into her work.

=== International career ===
At the end of the First World War, Donas returned to Paris and rented a studio at a studio complex at 26 Rue de Départ. The studio was previously occupied by Diego Riviera. Also, Piet Mondrian rented a studio in the same complex at that time. Donas joined the artist group Section d'Or which was revived after the war under the leading of Archipenko. Through this international group of connections and with the help of Archipenko who intensely promoted Donas, she was able to have her work published in several leading art magazines of the time: the Dutch De Stijl and the dadaist magazine Mécano, the German Der Sturm, the Italian Noi and the Belgian Sélection. In these years, Donas started publishing her work under the pseudonyms 'Tour d'Onasky', 'M. Donas' and later exclusively 'Tour Donas' which disguised her gender. Especially cubist and abstract art were seen as too intellectual and rational for women. For a female artists to work under a male pseudonym secured considerably more respect within the art world, a higher chance of promotion and thus of commissions and sales. The network she had built up in Nice and Paris made one of her first participations in a mayor exhibition possible: The Exhibition of French Art 1914–19 in London compiled by Léopold Zborowski in which she was present with seven of her paintings alongside work by Othon Friesz, Vlaminck, Derain, Matisse, Picasso, Modigliani, Valadon, Kisling, Léger, Lhote, Utrillo and Dufy. Archipenko continued promoting Donas' work internationally which lead to solo-exhibitions in Librairie Kundig in Geneva in December 1919 and the famous avant-garde gallery Der Sturm of Herwarth Walden in Berlin in Summer 1920 which would turn out to be the most important exhibitions in her entire career. Herwarth Walden most likely purchased many of her work which meant being recognized by one of the most influential dealers of that period.

She also exhibited her work together with among other Gleizes, Férat, Villon, Natalia Goncharova, Léger, Braque, Irène Lagut, Archipenko and R. Duchamp in the Section d'Or-exhibitions in Paris in Galerie La Boétie and successively at different locations in the Netherlands organized by Theo van Doesburg with whom she had become close friends. Donas visited him and his wife Lena Milis in Leiden during late spring 1920 to oversee the transportation of art works and to attend the opening in Rotterdam of the Section d'Or-exhibition. After her stay in the Netherlands, she went to visit her parents in Antwerp aiming to improve her financial situation by painting portraits of Jewish family friends. Following other commissions, which she all painted in a very traditional style and though herself to be conventional, she went to London in the late summer of 1920. Trying to make contact with the London art scene, as recommended by Van Doesburg, she met up with among other the Sitwells, C.R.W. Nevison, Jacob Epstein and Douglas Goldring.

Although little is known about the details, her relationship with Archipenko must have come to an end at this point. Her work, too, developed further abstract and in line with the purist ideas of Amédeé Ozenfant and Le Corbusier with which she came in contact through the magazine L'Esprit Nouveau and through Van Doesburg and De Stijl.

Donas returned to her studio in Paris in autumn 1920. For the first time, she exhibited her work in her home country in December 1920 in the gallery Sélection of André de Ridder and Paul-Gustave van Hecke in Brussels. From December 1920 until January 1921, her work was included as part of the Section d'Or group in an exhibition at the Palais électoral in Geneva. Organized by the Belgian artists Albert Daenens and the French sculptors Albert Gerbaud and Marcel Bourraine, the International Exhibition of Modern Art aimed to cover all new international artistic movements. Naturally, the exhibition was regarded as a very important event in contemporary art circuits and turned out to be an important networking event as well resulting in an exhibition of the Section d'Or in Rome in 1922.

Walden once again organized a big group exhibition at the Sturm gallery in January 1921 including twenty-four paintings of Donas and the work of Albert Gleizes, Jaques Villon, Louis Marcoussis, Julius Evola, Sonia Delaunay and again in April 1921 with five of her paintings and among other work by Chagall, Evola, Fischer, Gleizes and Klee. Walden continued supporting Donas by frequently featuring her in his exhibitions and publications until at least September 1925.

At one of these exhibitions, Donas work was certainly bought by American artist Katherine Dreier. In January 1920, she had founded the Societé Anonyme in New York together with Marcel Duchamp and Man Ray aiming to familiarize the American audience with the latest developments in European modern art. The Societé Anonyme showed Donas paintings and drawings alongside work by Campendonk, Klee, Schwitters, Molzahn and Stuckenberg in New York and later at a travelling group show at different other locations in the United States. Dreier continued to include Donas work in numerous group exhibitions until 1940. The Societé Anonyme-collection, including Donas' work, has later been donated by Dreier to the Yale University and are still kept at the Yale University Gallery in New Haven.

In the meantime, Donas continued working in Paris until she fell severely ill in the summer of 1921. The lack of savings forced her to leave her studio in Paris and return to her parents in Antwerp. In Antwerp, she must have been in contact with the Belgian art scene around Jozef Peeters seeing she participated prominently with twelve of her latest paintings and a portfolio of linocuts in a large-scale exhibition at El Bardo on Sint-Jacobsmarkt in Antwerp in January 1922 organized by Peeters in the framework of the Second Congress for Modern Art. By giving her exhibited paintings the title Composition with the Roman numerals I to VII, she clearly associated her work with that of the Belgian variant of international Constructivism 'plastique pure' (Pure plasticism), distancing herself even more from the movements in Paris.

By January 1922, she was back in Paris to marry Henri Franke, a philosophy student from a Belgian family whom she still knew from her childhood. In February, she got sick again and was diagnosed with a form of hepatitis which made the couple move to the Paris suburb Fontenay-aux-Roses, a popular resort among artists. There, she continued drawing and painting and her work was featured in a number of exhibitions in Paris, Düsseldorf and Oslo in 1922/1923. Her paintings started developing away from the geometric abstraction towards a more figurative style. Due to her weak health however, Donas and Franke permanently moved back to Belgium in July 1923. They settled in Ittre, a small village in Walloon Brabant where part of Franke's family lived already.

Even though, her work appeared at several exhibitions in Brussels, Berlin and Paris, she was not very well known in Belgium and did not enjoy the fame she received in her years in Paris. The themes in her works became more traditional, she painted mainly still lives and landscapes, and she moved away completely from cubism and abstraction. In April 1926 however, the gallery A La Vierge Poupine of Paul van Ostaijen and Geert Van Bruaene organized the first large-scale retrospective of Marthe Donas' oeuvre with seventy of her paintings. Through the renewal of her contacts in the avant-garde art scene in Belgium, Donas decided to move back into the city of Brussels at the beginning of 1927. Her work was admired by many of the Belgian artists though just a few knew about her cubist work at the beginning of the 1920s and she was rather seen as an up-and coming artist in Brussels. Again, it was her colour palette which drew most attention and which was seen as highly refined. Being inside this urban artistic milieu again and able to participate in a number of exhibitions in Brussels and in Paris with the artists' group L’Assault, reinvigorated her artistic inspiration. In a softer palette this time, she picked up a neo-cubist style again and produced a great body of work in the year 1927.

=== Hiatus from painting and second career ===
The renewed contact with the French and Belgian art scene and her rediscovered artistic energy did not last long though. Disheartened, she stopped painting entirely for 20 years. There was little appreciation for modern art in Belgium, additionally she experienced some personal setbacks. Her parents died shortly after another in 1927 and 1929 and financial straits further made life difficult forcing her and her husband to seek refuge once more in Ittre. At the age of forty-five, Marthe Donas got pregnant and gave birth to her daughter Francine in January 1931. After having moved around again for some years with her husband in search for an income, they returned to Ittre at the outbreak of the Second World War in the year 1939. Donas was now fully occupied with the household of Chateau Bauthier and the upbringing of her daughter, which proved not to be easy at her age. Significantly, when her daughter turned sixteen and independent, she started painting again.

Donas and Henri moved back the Brussels in 1948. Her paintings from that period expressed a sense of innocence and humour, Donas herself called it "romantic with a Cubist tenor", found appreciation in exhibitions in Brussels and Antwerp. Starting from 1954, her paintings became again more abstract and finally entirely non-figurative starting from 1958 drawing inspiration from pure intuition. Around that period, she came into contact with Dutch gallerist Maurits Bilcke who promoted her work extensively in the 1960s.

From the United States, too, came interest in especially her early work after Katherine Dreier had donated the collection of the Société Anonyme's collection to the Yale University's gallery. Also in Belgium, the interest grew into the pioneers of abstraction of the early 20th century. German art historian Herta Wescher included her work in her book about collages. Due to this upcoming attention towards her Marthe Donas started composing her autobiography. In the following years, she was featured in a number of important exhibitions among them The First Abstract Artists in Belgium: Tribute to the Pioneers in 1959 in Antwerp, Salon de femmes peintres et sculpteurs at the Musée d'Art Moderne de la Ville de Paris, a big overview of solely her work in two rooms at the Palais de Beaux-Arts in Brussels, both in 1960, and an exhibition dedicated to the influence of Herwarth Walden and his gallery Der Sturm at the Nationalgallerie in Berlin in 1961 alongside Archipenko, Chagall, Delaunay, Gleizes, Goncharova, Jawlenksy, Kandinsky, Klee, Kokoschka, Léger, Macke, Marc, Schwitters and Severini. Being included with these artists which have by then been acknowledged as the important avant-gardists of the 20th century, must have been especially gratifying for Donas.

While her work finally was internationally recognized, her health was declining and again she had financial struggles. She was forced to sell the majority of her work to Maurits and Suzanne Bilcke. Subsequently, a major Donas exhibition at the Schleiper gallery in Brussels was organized by the Bilckes in October 1961. This exhibition was a big success and received a lot of attention internationally by art critics and fellow artists alike. Maurits Bilcke further promoted her work and made sure it was included in important collections. In the 1960s, her work was purchased by the ministry of Belgium, the Museum of Fine Arts in Brussels, the Francophone Section of the Ministry of Education and the Royal Museum of Fine Arts in Antwerp. She was happy that towards the end of her life, she was finally recognized as one of the great pioneers of the avant-garde. Marthe Donas died on 31 January 1967 in the company of her husband and her daughter in a nursing home in Audreignies, Belgium.

== Exhibitions ==
- 1920: La Section d’Or, Galerie La Boétie, Paris, 5 march 1920.
- 2016: Donas. De Belgische avant-gardiste, Museum voor Schoone Kunsten, Gent.
- 2025: Donas, Archipenko & La Section d’Or. Enchanting Modernism, Royal Museum of Fine Arts (KMSKA), Antwerp

== Biography ==
- Boon, Kristien (2004). Marthe Donas (in Dutch). Oostkamp, Belgium: Stichting Kunstboek. ISBN 978-90-5856-126-8. OCLC 57442594.
- Eemans, Marc (1975). Moderne kunst in België (in Dutch). Hasselt: Heideland-Orbis. ISBN 90-291-5737-2. OCLC 901171295.
- Eemans, Marc (1979). Biografisch woordenboek der Belgische kunstenaars van 1830 tot 1970 (in Dutch). Vol. 1. Brussel, België: Arto. OCLC 10431083.
- Faxedas, Maria Lluïsa (2013). "¿Contra sí mismas? Mujeres artistas en los orígenes de la abstracción" [Against Themselves? Women Artists in the Origins of Abstract Art]. Barcelona Research Art Creation (in Spanish). 1 (1): 27–61. doi:10.4471/brac.2013.02.
- Herbert, Robert (1984). The Société anonyme and the Dreier bequest at Yale University : a catalogue raisonne. New Haven: Published for the Yale University Art Gallery by Yale University Press. ISBN 978-0-300-03040-2.
- Hildebrandt, Hans (1928). Die Frau als Künstlerin (in German). R. Mosse.
- de Jong, Leen (1999). "Marthe Donas". In van der Stighelen, Katlijne; Westen, Mirjam (eds.). Elck zijn waerom: vrouwelijke kunstenaars in België en Nederland, 1500–1950 (in Dutch). Ludion. ISBN 978-90-5544-271-3.
- Pauwels, Peter J.H. (2015). Marthe Donas – A Woman Artist in the Avant-Garde. Antwerp: Ludion & The Marthe Donas Foundation. ISBN 978-94-91819-41-4.
- Pauwels, Peter (2018). "'Votre lettre m'a bien interessée': Marthe "Tour" Donas and the Belgian Art Scene around 1920". In Inga Rossi-Schrimpf (ed.). 14/18 – Rupture or Continuity: Belgian Art around World War I. Leuven University Press. ISBN 978-94-6270-136-6.
- Piron, Paul-L. (1999). De Belgische beeldende kunstenaars uit de 19de en 20ste eeuw (in Dutch). Vol. 1. Brussels: Art in Belgium. ISBN 90-76676-01-1. OCLC 48876166.
- Tuijn, Marguerite (2015). C'est donc partout la même chose" : Marthe Donas explore le monde de l'art anglais pour Théo van Doesburg (in French). Ittre: Musée Marthe Donas. ISBN 978-2-9601631-0-0.
- Wescher, Herta (1971). Collage. Robert Erich Wolf. New York: Abrams. ISBN 0-8109-0184-6. OCLC 280428.
