= Eugeniusz Zak =

Polish artist

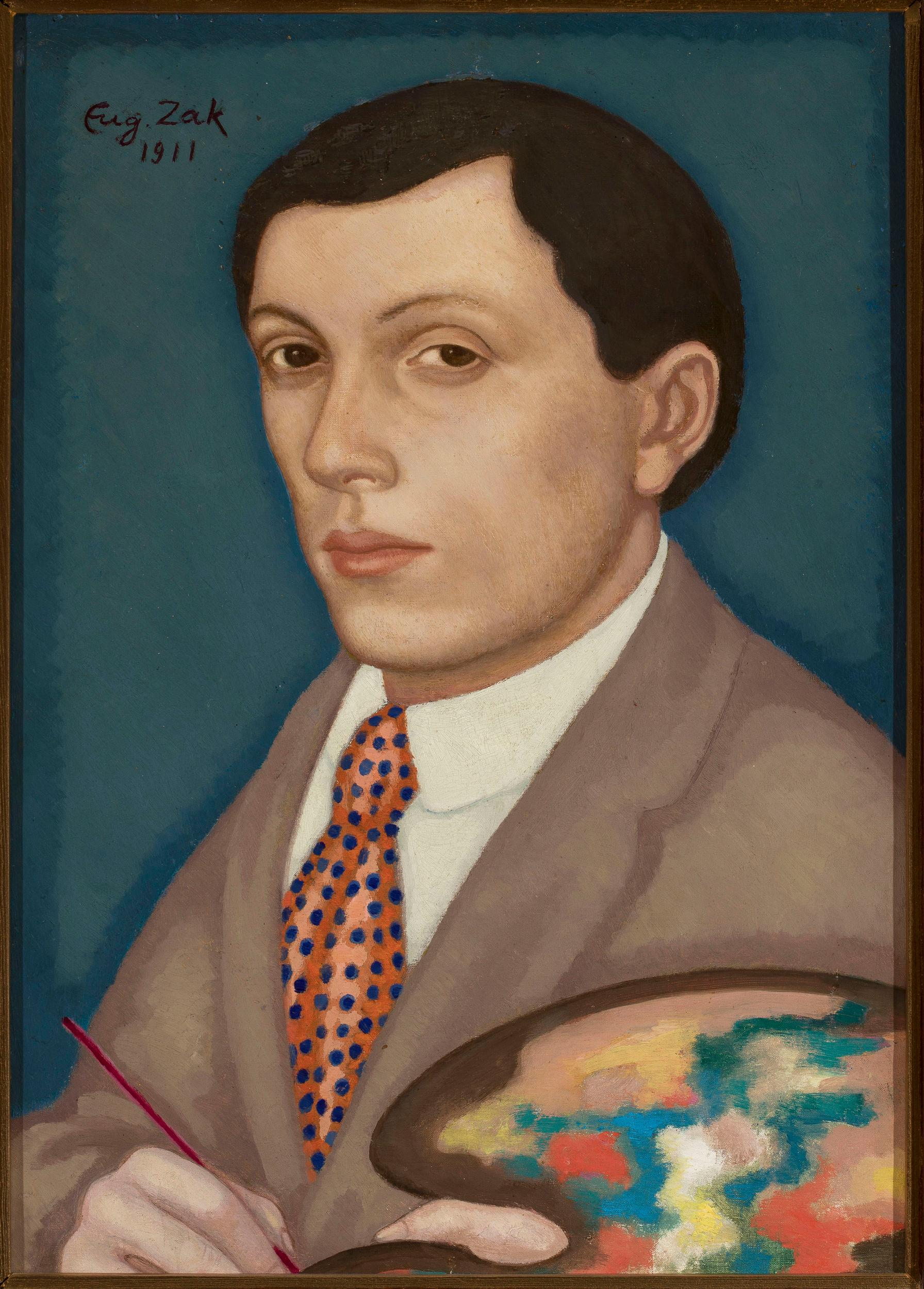
Eugeniusz Zak, self-portrait, 1911, National Museum, Warsaw

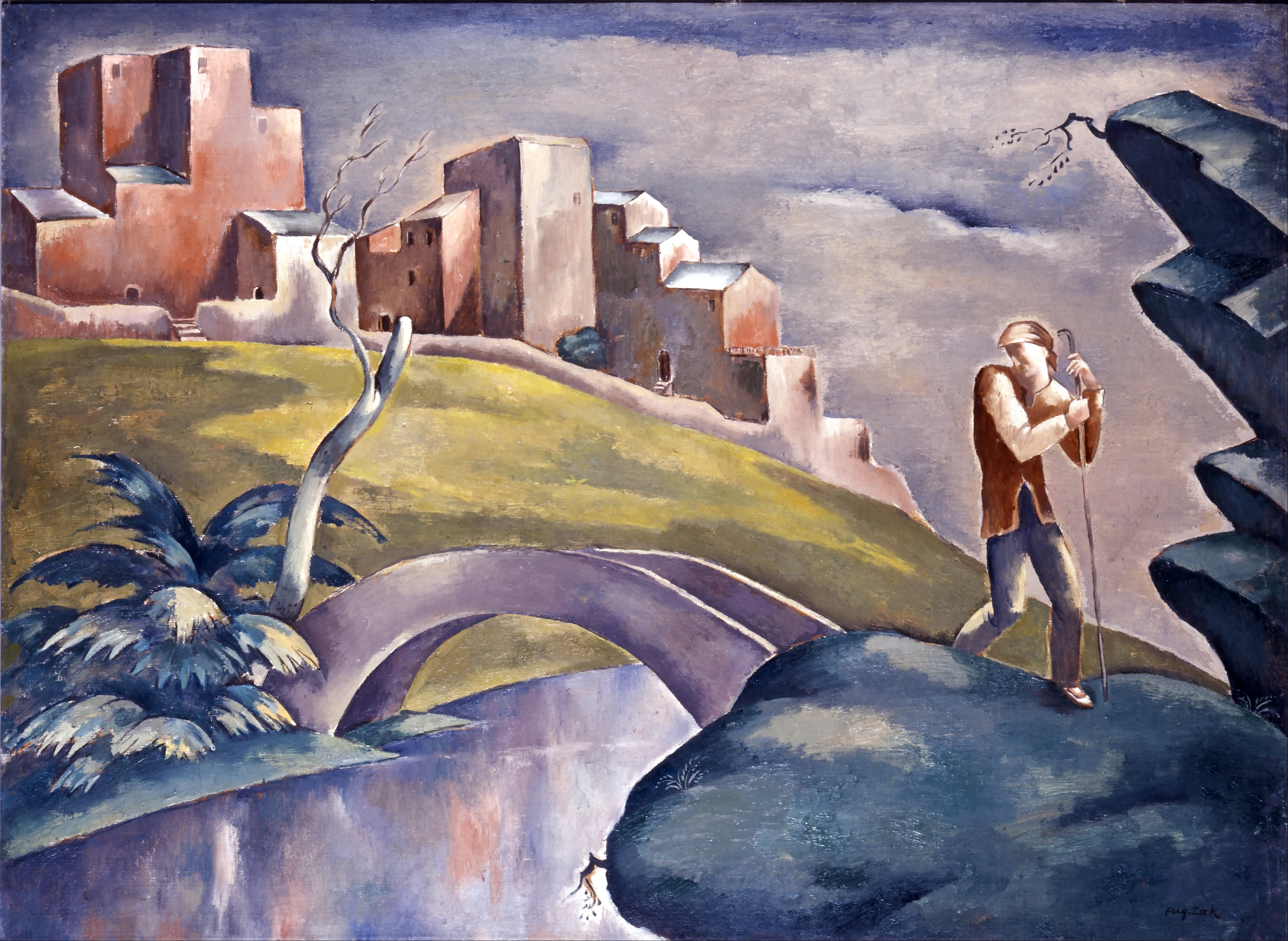
Landscape with Wanderer, Muzeum Sztuki w Łodzi

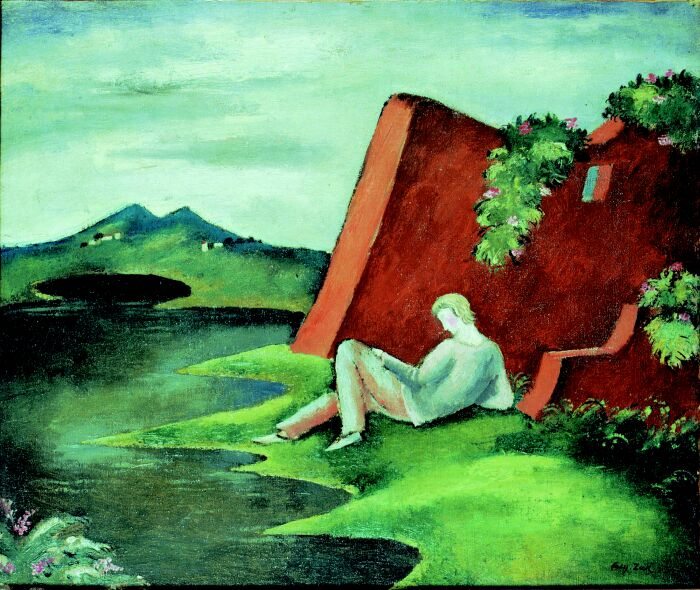
Idyllic Landscape

Eugeniusz Zak (15 December 1884 – 15 January 1926), also known as Eugène Zak and Eugene Zak, was a Polish artist.

== Life ==
Eugeniusz Zak was born to Jewish family in Mogilno, Minsk Governorate (nowadays Belarus). As a boy he moved to Warsaw, where he graduated from a non-classical secondary school. In 1902, he left for Paris to undertake studies, first at the École des Beaux-Arts in the studio of the aged master of academism Jean-Léon Gérôme, and then at Académie Colarossi in the studio of Albert Besnard. In 1903, he traveled to Italy and toward the end of the year to Munich, where he entered a private school run by the Slovenian Anton Ažbe.

In 1904 he returned to Paris. In the same year his debut took place at the Autumn Salon and two years later he was accepted as a jury member in the drawing section of this institution. In the years 1906-1908 he made trips to Brittany (Pont l’Abbé, among other places). On the Seine he was involved in the life of the Polish colony, participating in the Society of Polish Artists in Paris, among other organizations. He befriended many Polish artists there, including Roman Kramsztyk, Wacław Borowski, Leopold Gottlieb, Jerzy Merkel, Elie Nadelman, Mela Muter, Tytus Czyżewski and Zygmunt Menkes.

His reputation grew rapidly. The French government purchased of one of his paintings for the Musée du Luxembourg (1910), he organized a one-man show at Galerie Druet (1911), he was connected with important personalities of Parisian cultural life, including the critics Adolf Basler and André Salmon, and he became an exhibiting member of the Société Normande de Peinture Moderne. In 1912 he became a professor at the Académie de La Palette. In 1913 he married a beginning painter Jadwiga Kon, who managed the well-known Galerie Zak after his death. Between 1914 and 1916 he stayed in southern France (Nice, St Paul-de-Vence, and Vence), and also visited Lausanne in Switzerland.

In 1916 he returned with his family to Poland, settling in his wife's hometown of Częstochowa. He associated with the Formists. Upon his frequent visits to Warsaw, he collaborated with the future members of Rytm ("rhythm"), a group he co-founded in 1921. In 1922 he left Poland for good. First, he went to Germany, where he had already been known and esteemed before the World War I. He visited Berlin and later Bonn, where he carried out a commission to decorate the interior of the villa of the architect Fritz August Breuhaus with paintings. He co-operated with the periodical Deutsche Kunst und Dekoration, publishing articles on certain artists who were close to him. In 1923 he settled once again in Paris, where he joined his friends Zygmunt Menkes and Marc Chagall. His growing artistic fame and financial successes ended suddenly when he died of a heart attack in Paris, aged 41. He did not live to take over the faculty of painting, which had been offered to him by the Academy of Fine Arts, Cologne, Germany.

== Work ==
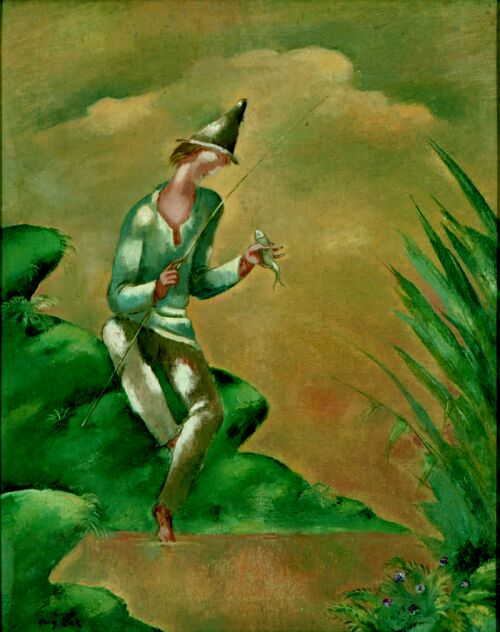
Fisherman

From the beginning, Żak expressed his artistic temperament through a sophisticated application of line, referring in his sanguine portraits to works by Leonardo, Botticelli, Holbein and Dürer. In the early stage of his career, he approached the style of the Nabis, through the manipulation of flat areas, enclosed within distinct contours and faded, slightly matte colors. For a brief period, he succumbed – like so many of his Parisian colleagues – to the exoticism and folk atmosphere of Brittany. He also borrowed certain motifs from Chinese porcelain and Persian miniatures. He painted views of Parisian back streets and boulevards on the Seine and, sporadically, took up New Testament themes.

Even before World War I, some of his compositions were in line with the idyllic tradition represented by works of such artists as Nicolas Poussin, Claude Lorrain (called le Lorraine), Antoine Watteau, and most of all Puvis de Chavannes, whose Poor Fisherman at the Louvre inspired a number of Żak's paintings and drawings. The Polish artist began to intensify the stylization of his figural silhouettes and faces. Żak's Arcadia, inspired by original Italian and southern French landscapes as well as those by European art masters, was inhabited by people with a hermaphroditic beauty, undoubtedly linked to Żak's fascination with the Renaissance. Their physiognomies recall the profiles of ancient Greek art, with the nose angled straight from the forehead and distinctly outlined eyes, while the faces bear a languorous, nostalgic expression. Żak, like Modigliani, by means of sophisticated drawing and a poetic imagination with a romantic tint, created a very special "human race" found only in the figures of his pictures.

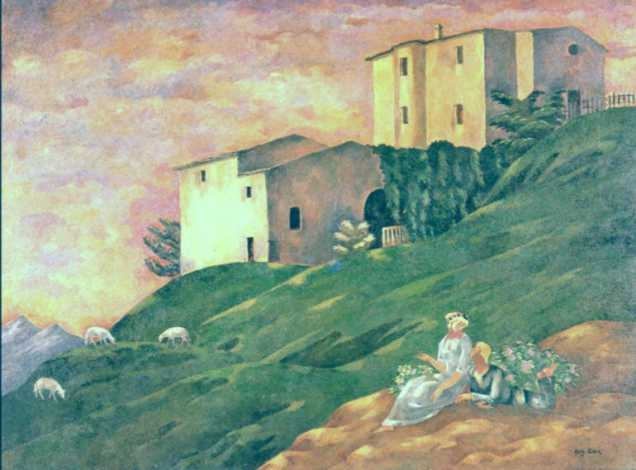
Pastorale

His cubelike houses and masses of rocks were always composed with a decorative rhythm. These works were often identified by the use of combining broken colors and a reserved expression. They are often compared with achievements of certain representatives of the German New Objectivity, and some of the Italians from the Valori Plastici group, though by no means is it possible to speak here of direct influences.

Around 1917-1920 social outsiders, the nostalgic loners who spend their lives in saloons or interiors with scanty furniture, replaced the earlier fishermen and their families, sailors, and merchants. Here we have a clear connection with the "miserable" trend of the young Pablo Picasso, such as his Saltimbanques of the blue period. At the same time, these sad themes are counterbalanced by representations of happy families in various configurations: a mother playing with a smiling child, a family playing with a puppet-theatre, etc. The paintings from his last period gain more light and life, while the artist does not eschew dissonances. Contours dissolve on the edges of bordering color areas and spot-lighting melts the surfaces of stylized forms. Żak's repertoire of forms may not be rich, but it is characteristic enough due to make his works immediately recognizable. His style inspired many Polish artists gathered around "Rhythm", a group which co-created a Polish version of Art Deco. The important feature of Żak's grammar of forms was his treatment of the human silhouette, which the painter endowed with elongated proportions that had little in common with those of the real models, a mannerist over-emphasis on contrapposto, and dance-like postures usually ascribed to marionettes or dummies rather than to people.

His late paintings seemed to open a new chapter in his oeuvre: he now began to draw on the color and painterly effects of the Impressionists (primarily those of Renoir) once so much despised by him.

== Exhibitions ==
During Zak's lifetime, his one-man shows were organized in Paris (1911, 1925) and Warsaw (1917). Apart from the Paris Salons (from 1904) and an exhibition of the Polish artists residing in Paris, which was organized in Barcelona (1912), his works appeared at the famous Armory Show in New York City, Chicago and Boston, where he was the only Pole besides Elie Nadelman (1913), at the Venice Biennale (1914), and at the Parisian exhibitions of the Association France-Pologne in Paris (1924). Moreover, he took part in exhibitions of the Society of Polish Artists "Sztuka" ("Art"), beginning in 1908, as well as those of the Polish Expressionists (later called Formists) before they formed an official group (Kraków 1913 and Zakopane 1916) and after (Kraków 1917 and Lwów 1918). He exhibited in Warsaw as a member of the Polish Art Club (1917–1919), the New Group (1918), and Association of Polish Artists "Rhythm" in Kraków (1923) and Warsaw (1924).

The artist's posthumous exhibitions occurred at the three Paris Salons and at Parisian galleries as well as in Warsaw and Düsseldorf (all in 1926), New York (1927), Buffalo (1928), London (1929) and several more times in Paris, including at the Galerie Zak (1936, 1938). The last, run by the artist's widow, enjoyed the reputation of being one of the most interesting galleries on the left bank of the Seine: it sponsored, among other things, the first exhibition by members of the Paris Committee, known as the Kapists, several one-man shows of Polish and Jewish artists active in France, and Wassily Kandinsky's first Parisian one-man show.

== Murder of Jadwiga Zak and looting ==
The Galerie Zak was looted and liquidated by French collaborators and Zak's widow, Jadwiga, and their son were murdered in Auschwitz by the Nazis. Many of the looted artworks are still missing.
