= Société Normande de Peinture Moderne =

Collective of avant-garde artists from the early 20th century

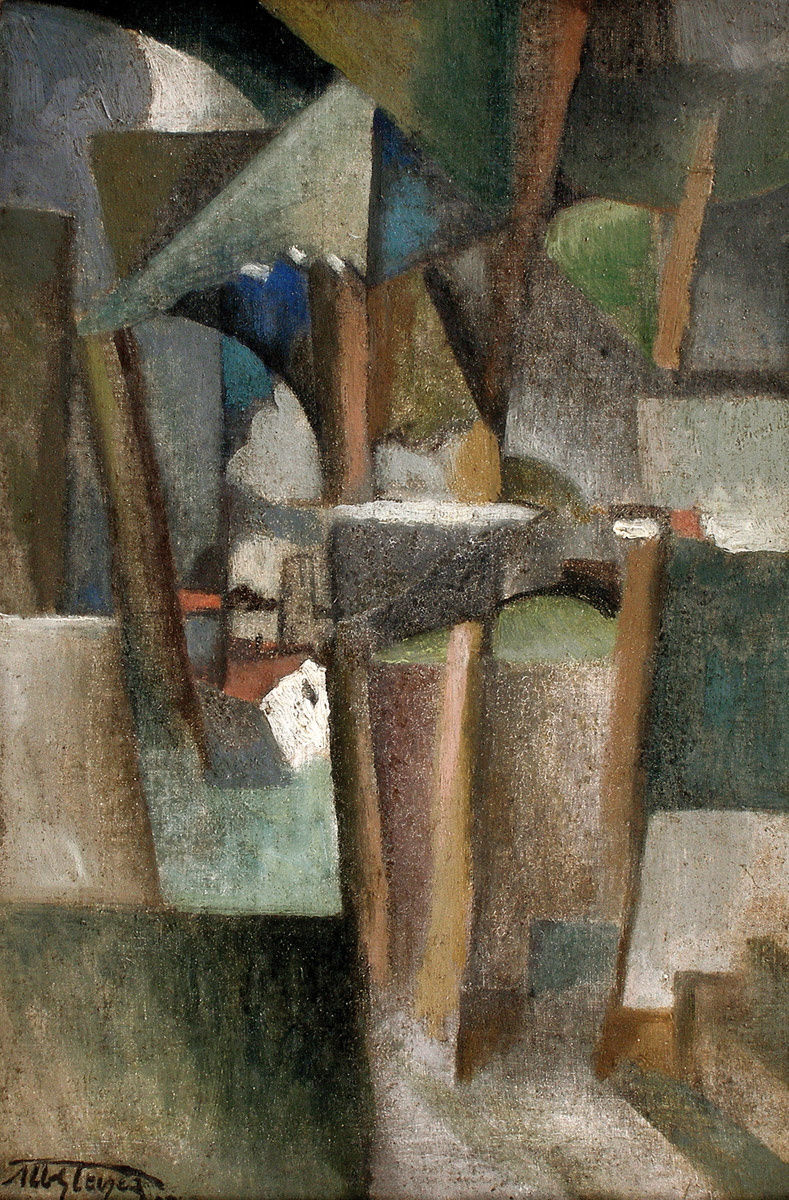
- Albert Gleizes, 1910-12, Les Arbres (The Trees), oil on canvas, 41 x 27 cm

The Société Normande de Peinture Moderne, also known as Société de Peinture Moderne, or alternatively, Normand Society of Modern Painting, was a collective of eminent painters, sculptors, poets, musicians and critics associated with Post-Impressionism, Fauvism, Cubism and Orphism. The Société Normande de la Peinture Moderne was a diverse collection of avant-garde artists; in part a subgrouping of the Cubist movement, evolving alongside the so-called Salon Cubist group, first independently then in tandem with the core group of Cubists that emerged at the Salon d'Automne and Salon des Indépendants between 1909 and 1911 (i.e., Albert Gleizes, Jean Metzinger, Fernand Léger, Robert Delaunay and Henri Le Fauconnier). Historically, the two groups merged in 1912, at the Section d'Or exhibition, but documents from the period prior to 1912 indicate the merging occurred earlier and in a more convoluted manner.

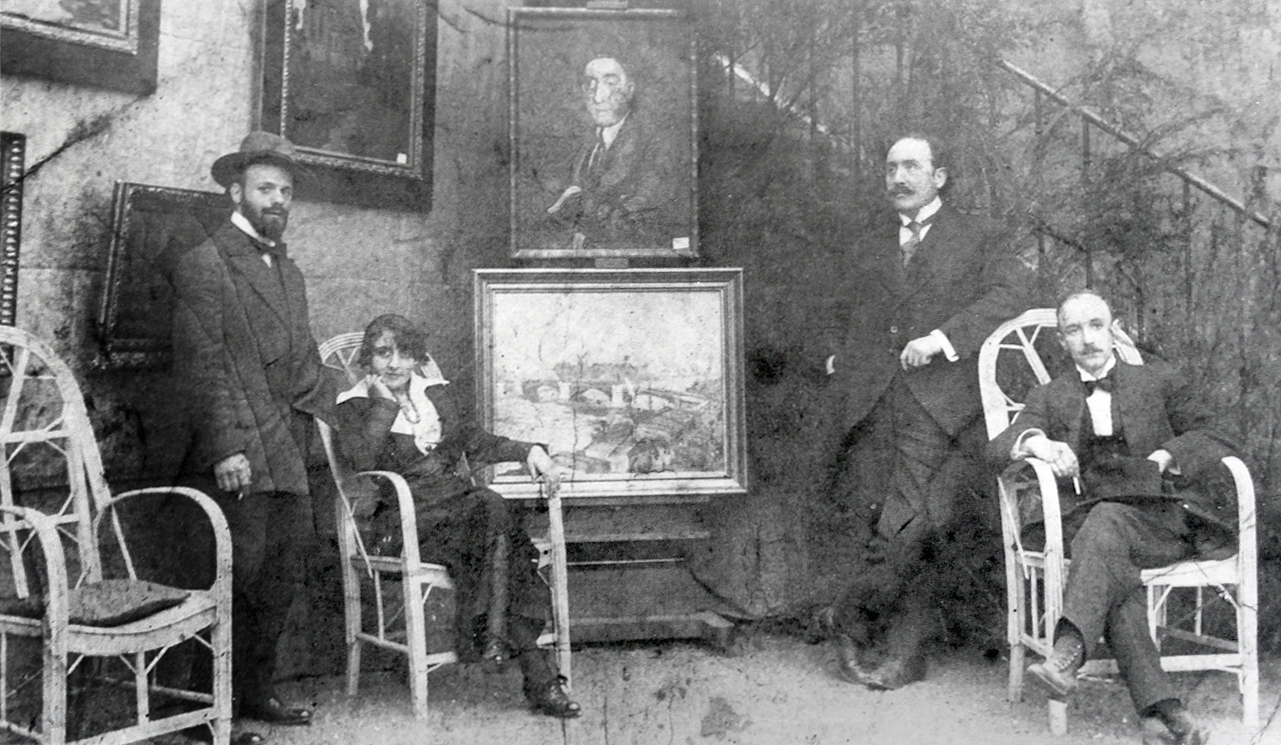
From left to right: Robert Antoine Pinchon, Mrs. Dumont, La Broue and Pierre Dumont, at an exhibition before World War I

== History ==
=== Groupe des XXX ===
==== 1907-1908 ====
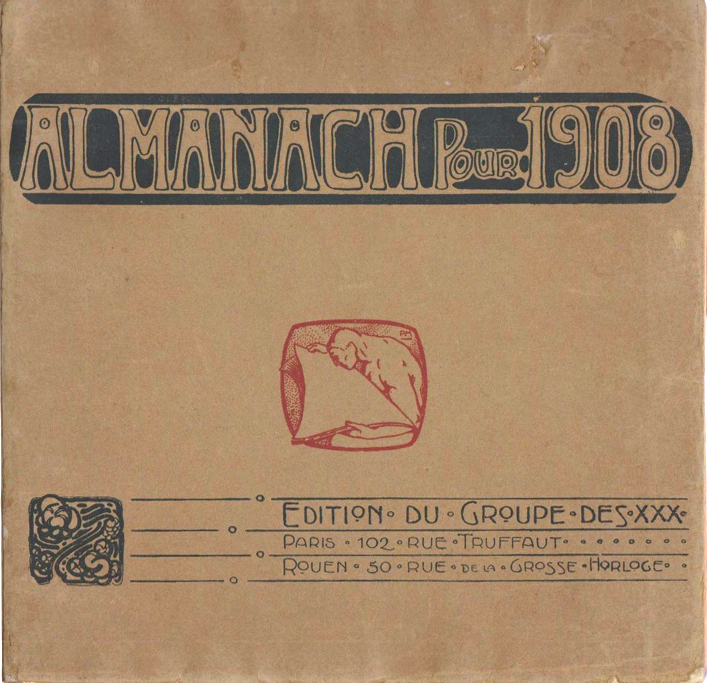
Almanach pour 1908, Edition du Group des XXX, December 1907, Paris, Rouen

In 1907, at the instigation of Pierre Dumont and inspired by Othon Friesz's group called Le Cercle de l'Art Moderne, in Le Havre, an association called Groupe XXX (thirty) was formed as a collective of independent painters, sculptors, writers, poets and music composers from the vicinity of Rouen. The birth of Le Cercle de l'Art Moderne had inspired the foundation of another group in Le Havre named Société havraise des Beaux-arts, presided over by Jean-Paul Laurens, member of the Institut and Commendeur de la Légion d'Honneur.

An inverse phenomenon was produced in Rouen and the group of thirty (XXX) independent artists emerged. Dumont's objective was to unite avant-garde artists. Contributing to the endeavor the group of artists included Henri Matisse, André Derain, Raoul Dufy, Albert Marquet, Maurice Louvrier, Charles Duhamel, Charles Frechon, Gaston Prunier, Pierre Girieud, Gaston Gosselin, Tristan Klingsor, Eugène Tirvert, Ernest Morel, Maurice de Vlaminck and Robert Antoine Pinchon.

The first exhibition of the Groupe des XXX was held at Galerie Legrip in Rouen, 29 October - 12 November 1907.

To promote their eclecticism the group published a "manifesto" called "Almanach pour 1908" which included literary and graphic works by artists typically associated with the new generation of l'École de Rouen, as those of well-known Parisian artists. This high quality catalog was published in an edition of 450.

The founders of the Groupe des XXX would soon rebaptize their association Société Normande de Peinture Moderne.

==== 1909 ====
Marcel Duchamp, 1911, La sonate (Sonata), oil on canvas, 145.1 x 113.3 cm, Philadelphia Museum of Art

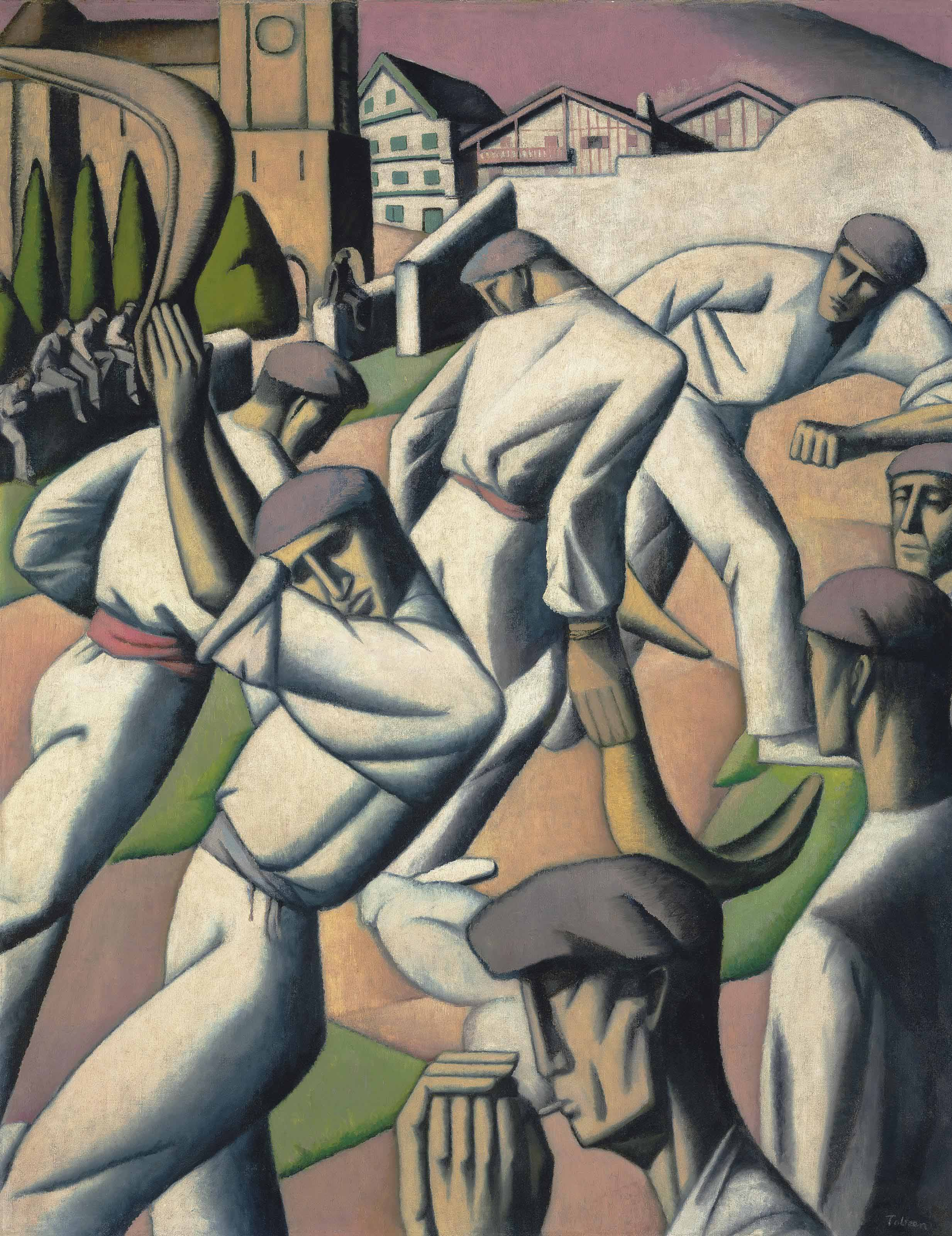
Tobeen, 1912, Pelotaris, oil on canvas, 147.5 x 115.5 cm, shown at Salon des Indépendants 1912, and Moderni Umeni, SVU Mánes, Prague, 1914

5 June 1909 the statutes of Société de Peinture Moderne presented 22 May are published in the Journal Officiel. The founders, Pierre Dumont, Robert Antoine Pinchon, Yvonne Barbier, and Eugène Tirvert, declare the formation of the "Société de Peinture Moderne, which has the goal of informing the general public of a modern artistic trend through a series of exhibitions".

The Société Normande de Peinture Moderne attracted the participation of Raoul Dufy, a native of Le Havre, Georges Braque, Henri Matisse, Maurice de Vlaminck, André Derain, Joseph Delattre, Albert Marquet, Maurice Louvrier, Francis Picabia, Maurice Utrillo, Othon Friesz, Francis Picabia, and Roger de La Fresnaye, among others.

=== Salon de la Société Normande ===
==== 1910 ====
The first of five exhibitions organized by the Société Normande de Peinture Moderne took place at the Salle Boieldieu in Rouen, 65 rue Ganterie, 20 December 1909 – 20 January 1910. The preface to the exhibition was written by Élie Faure (1873-1937). Faure was a friend of Eugène Carrière in 1904 and was a member of the Comité du Salon d'Automne and a juror for the Salon d'Automne paintings in 1907. Faure, who had trained as a doctor and had politically active links, wrote art criticism from April 1902 in L'Aurore. He had studied at the elite Parisian Lycee Henri IV (1887-1891) under the philosopher Henri Bergson; an influential force of inspiration amongst the Cubists.

Also participating in this movement were members of the Duchamp family, Suzanne Duchamp, Jacques Villon, Raymond Duchamp-Villon and Marcel Duchamp, also natives of Normandy. Associates included Jean Metzinger, Frank Kupka, Tobeen, Henri Le Fauconnier, Jean Marchand, and the sculptors Joseph Csaky and Alexander Archipenko

==== 1911, Rouen, Paris ====
On 6 May 1911 the Société Normande held a second exhibition 41 rue du Gros-Horloge, in the center of Rouen. The preface of the catalog was written by Élie Faure. Lectures during the exhibition were given on Thursdays and concerts on Sundays.

In 1910-11 Dumont moved into the Le Bateau-Lavoir becoming friends with Juan Gris, Max Jacob and Guillaume Apollinaire.

From 20 November to 16 December 1911 the Société Normande organized their first exhibition in Paris which took place at the Galerie d'Art Ancien et d'Art Contemporain, 3 Rue Tronchet. The preface of the catalog was written by René Blum (1878-1942), the coeditor, journalist and art critic who between 1910 and 1914 wrote in Gil Blas. His brother, Léon Blum, was a literary critic and future Socialist politician. René Blum, in his preface, asserted that the advent of photography had liberated artists from the need to imitate nature, and that 'pure imagination' as a source for inspiration had resulted in art works whose 'originality of forms somewhat outstripped the capacity of our understanding'. Echoing the avant-garde mandates of Élie Faure 1909 preface that artists of the Société Normande had far exceeding 'the mob's habits of seeing' in pursuit of their 'imperious' imaginations.

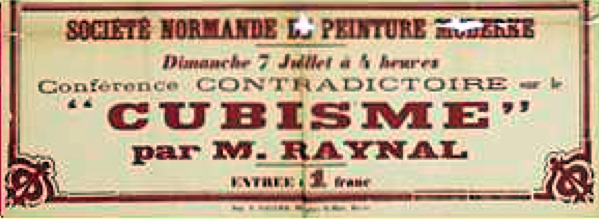
Société Normande de Peinture Moderne, Conference Contradictoire sur le "Cubisme", 1912

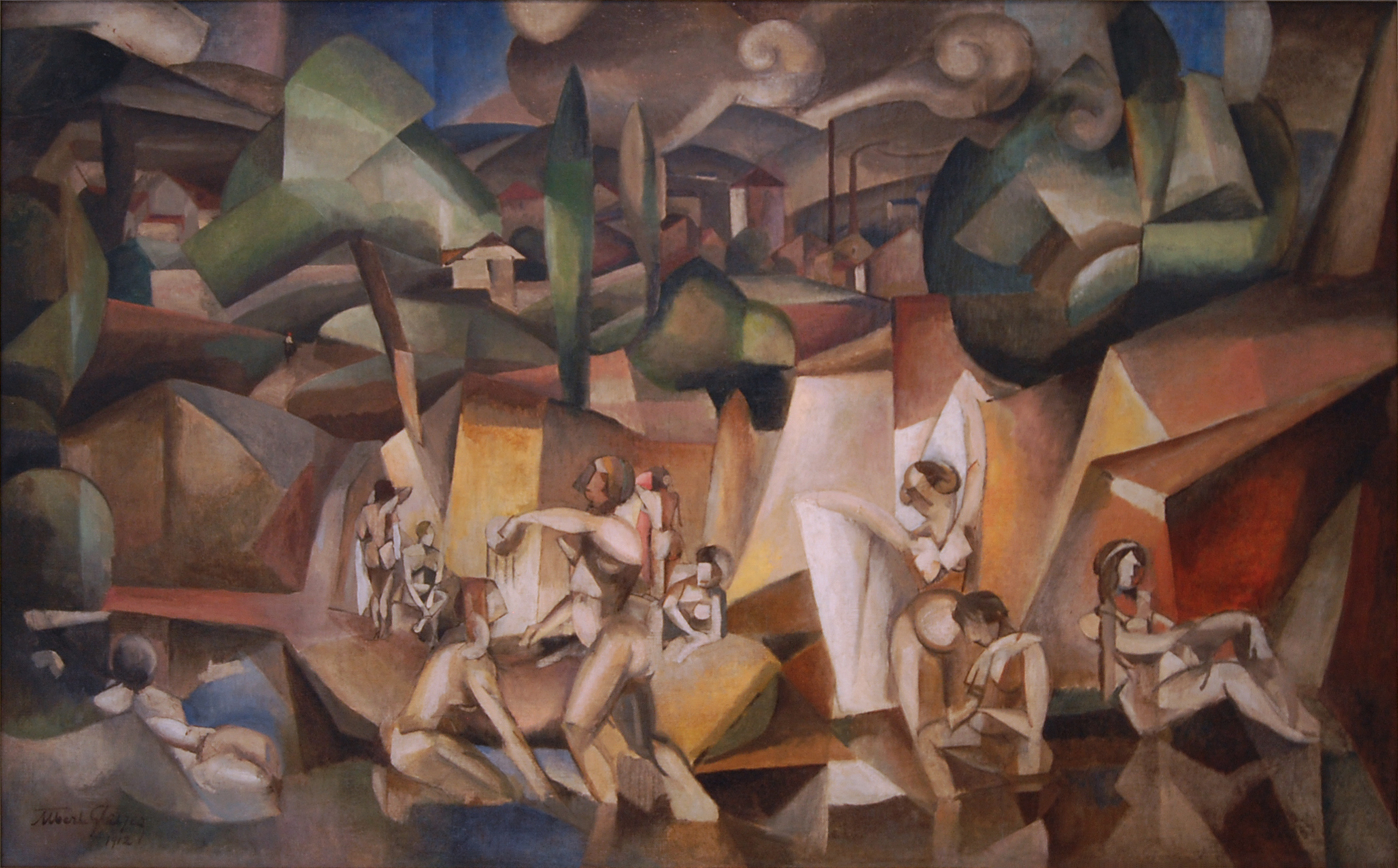
Albert Gleizes, 1912, Les Baigneuses (The Bathers), oil on canvas, 105 x 171 cm. Exhibited at the Salon des Indépendants in Paris during the spring of 1912, and the Salon de la Section d'Or, Galerie La Boétie in Paris, October 1912. Musée d'Art Moderne de la Ville de Paris

In addition to the works of Gleizes, Metzinger, Léger, Picabia, Le Fauconnier, Roger de La Fresnaye, André Lhote, the Duchamps, Dumont, Tobeen and Archipenko, works were exhibited by Raoul Dufy, Marie Laurencin, Othon Friesz, André Mare, Eugène Zak, Luc-Albert Moreau, Paul Vera, André Dunoyer de Segonzac and Robert Antoine Pinchon.

During the course of 1911 this group assisted Albert Gleizes in the preparation of the Salon de la Section d'Or exhibition that would be held in October 1912 at the Galerie La Boétie, Paris. On Mondays there were regular meetings with Gleizes in his studio in the Paris suburb of Courbevoie.

==== 1912 ====
The Société Normande held from 15 June to 15 July 1912 their fourth exhibition, called the Salon de Juin, at the Salle du skating in Rouen. Forewords in the catalog were written by Maurice Raynal and Élie Faure. In his forward, Faure—in addition to scientific, social, ethical and political overtones—included a Bergsonian philosophical overlay of 'intuition', 'creativity' and 'dynamism' to the avant-gardist discourse, something missing from his 1911 preface. Metzinger and Gleizes would do the same in writing the Cubist manifesto Du "Cubisme", published for the occasion of the Salon de la Section d'Or.

The president of the 1912 exhibition was Pierre Dumont, the secretary was Camille La Broue, and the committee was formed by Eugène Tirvert, Camille Lieucy, Jacques Villon, Duchamp-Villon and Francis Picabia. The hanging committee included Pierre Dumont, Robert Antoine Pinchon, Maurice Louvrier, Eugène Tirvert, and Marcel Duchamp.

Maurice Raynal, a preeminent art critic, played a major role in defending Cubism in Kantian terms. In 1912 he replaced Apollinaire at L'Intransigeant and simultaneously was hired by Louis Vauxcelles to write in Gil Blas. In his forward for this exhibition—his first writing on Cubism—Raynal paints the artistic avant-garde as parallel to scientists whose 'very data will turn the common understanding and ordinary sensibilities upside down'. Science and visual arts evolved together leading to 'a more positivistic age'. Artists, just as scientists, were able to capture the 'essence of things'. The goal or art, writes Raynal, is not the 'slavish imitation of nature', but its 'interpretation in accordance with the artist's intellectual capacity'.

At this exhibition the general public of Rouen and surrounding areas were introduced to Cubism for the first time, but three paintings by Francis Picabia attracted particular attention for their high degree of abstraction; Tarentelle, Port de Naples and Paysage. In addition, works were exhibited by Gleizes (5), Dumont (2), Lhote (3), Léger (2), Gris (3), Villon (6), La Fresnaye (2), and Tobeen (3). This exhibition was in effect the dress rehearsal for the Salon de la Section d'Or.

During the exhibition, on June 23, a paper was presented by Guillaume Apollinaire, entitled Le sublime modern. On Sunday, July 7 the art critic Maurice Raynal gave a lecture on Cubism. The entrance fee was 1 FF.

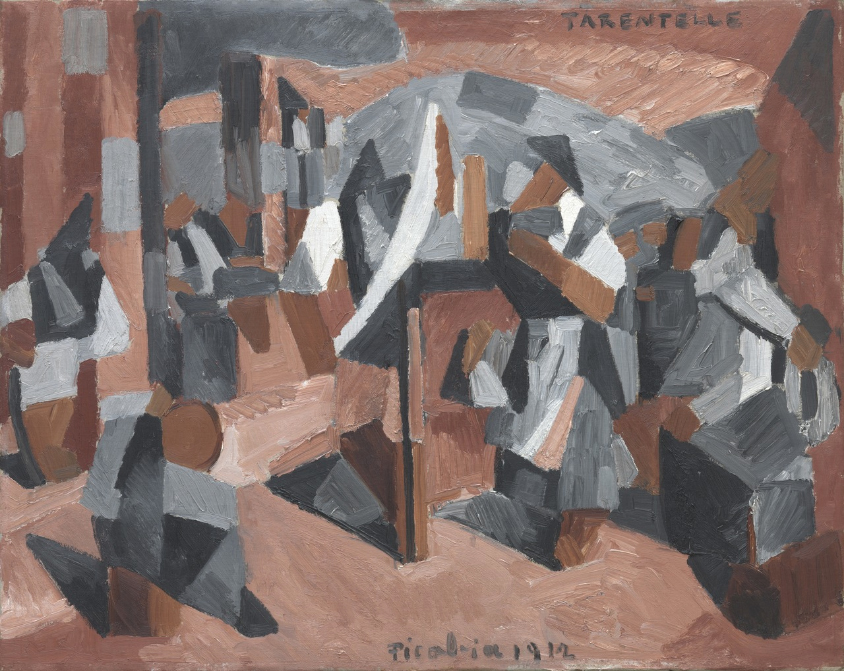
Francis Picabia, 1912, Tarentelle, oil on canvas, 73.6 x 92.1 cm, Museum of Modern Art, New York. Reproduced in Du "Cubisme"

The 1912 Salon de la Section d'Or was arguably the most important pre-World War I Cubist exhibition. During the previous year the Cubists and a large number of their associates had exhibited at the Galerie de l'Art Contemporain (rue Tronchet, Paris) under the auspices of the Société Normande de Peinture Moderne. This exhibition had received some attention in the press (l'Autorité and Paris Journal), though due to the diversity of the works presented it had been referred to as an exposition des fauves et cubistes. The Salon de la Section d'Or, however, was generally accepted as being entirely Cubist in nature. Over 200 works were displayed, and the fact that many of the artists showed artworks representative of their development from 1909 to 1912 gave the exhibition the allure of a Cubist retrospective.

Practically all the artists of the Section d'Or had already been brought together the previous year (Nov-Dec, 1911) by the Société Normande de Peinture Moderne.

The 5th and last exhibition of the Société Normande de la Peinture Moderne, which included works by Utrillo, Friesz, Guillaumin, Luce, Vlaminck, Pinchon and others, opened 27 June 1914, just before the onset of World War I; an event that largely ended the group's activities.

== Notable members and associates ==
- August Agero
- Guillaume Apollinaire
- Alexander Archipenko
- André Bacque
- Alcide Le Beau
- Albertine Bernouard
- René Blum
- Jean-Louis Boussingault
- Georges Braque
- Joseph Csaky
- Joseph Delattre
- Henri de Saint-Delis
- André Derain
- Georges Ribemont-Dessaignes
- Richard Desvallières
- Marcel Duchamp
- Suzanne Duchamp
- Raymond Duchamp-Villon
- Pierre Dumont
- Pierre Hodé
- Henri le Fauconnier
- Élie Faure
- Roger de La Fresnaye
- Othon Friesz
- Jean-Louis Gampert
- Pierre Girieud
- Albert Gleizes
- Gaston Gosselin
- Juan Gris
- Armand Guillaumin
- František Kupka
- Marie-Thérèse Lanoa
- Marie Laurencin
- Fernand Léger
- André Lhote
- Camille Lieucy
- Alfred Lombard
- Robert Lotiron
- Maurice Louvrier
- Maximilien Luce
- Jean Marchand
- André Mare
- Maurice Marinot
- Albert Marquet
- Henri Matisse
- Jean Metzinger
- Luc-Albert Moreau
- Elie Nadelman
- Bernard Naudin
- Francis Picabia
- Robert Antoine Pinchon
- Pol Pitt
- Maurice Princet
- Maurice Raynal
- Georges Ribemont-Dessaignes
- Jeanne Rij-Rousseau
- Jean Texcier
- Eugène Tirvert
- Tobeen
- Maurice Utrillo
- Henry Valensi
- Paul Vera
- André Alexandre Verdilhan
- Louis Mathieu Verdilhan
- Jacques Villon
- Maurice de Vlaminck
- Eugène Zak

== Other works exhibited ==
Marcel Duchamp, 1911, La sonate (Sonata), oil on canvas, 145.1 x 113.3 cm, Philadelphia Museum of Art

Marie Laurencin, 1911, Die Jungen Damen, Les jeunes femmes, The young women

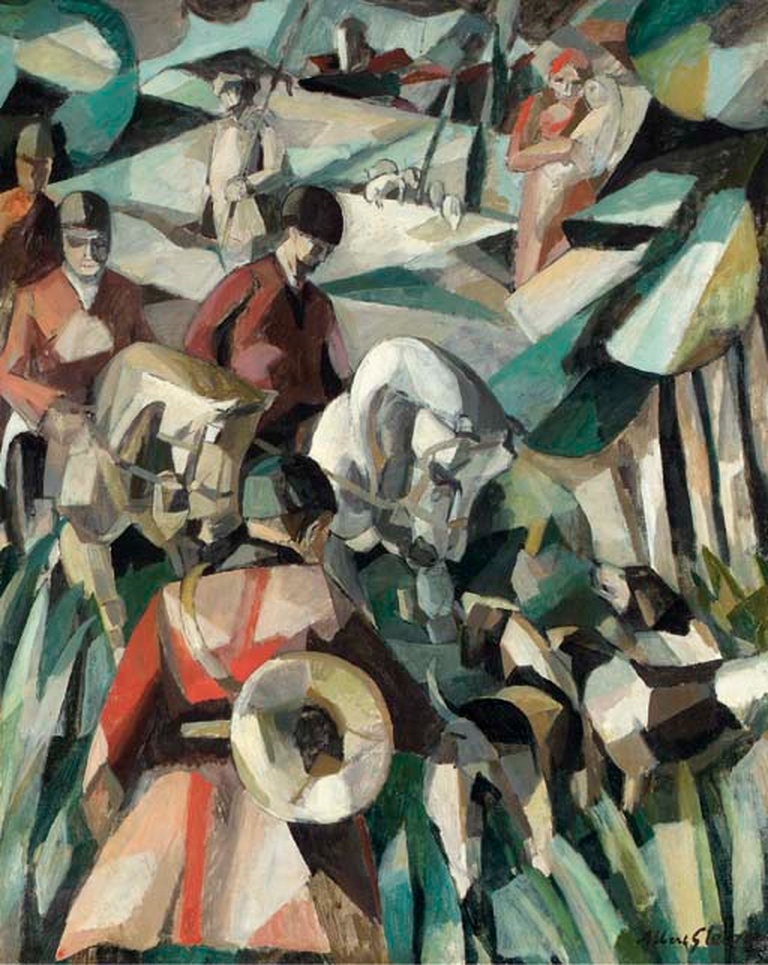
Albert Gleizes, 1911, La Chasse (the Hunt), oil on canvas, 123.2 x 99 cm, private collection

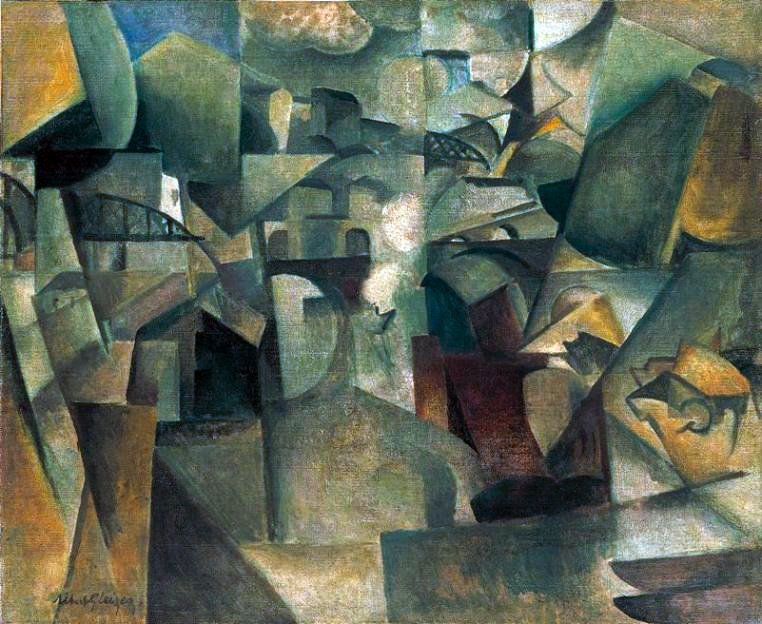
Albert Gleizes, 1912, Les ponts de Paris (Passy), The Bridges of Paris (Passy), oil on canvas, 60.5 x 73.2 cm, Museum Moderner Kunst (mumok), Vienna

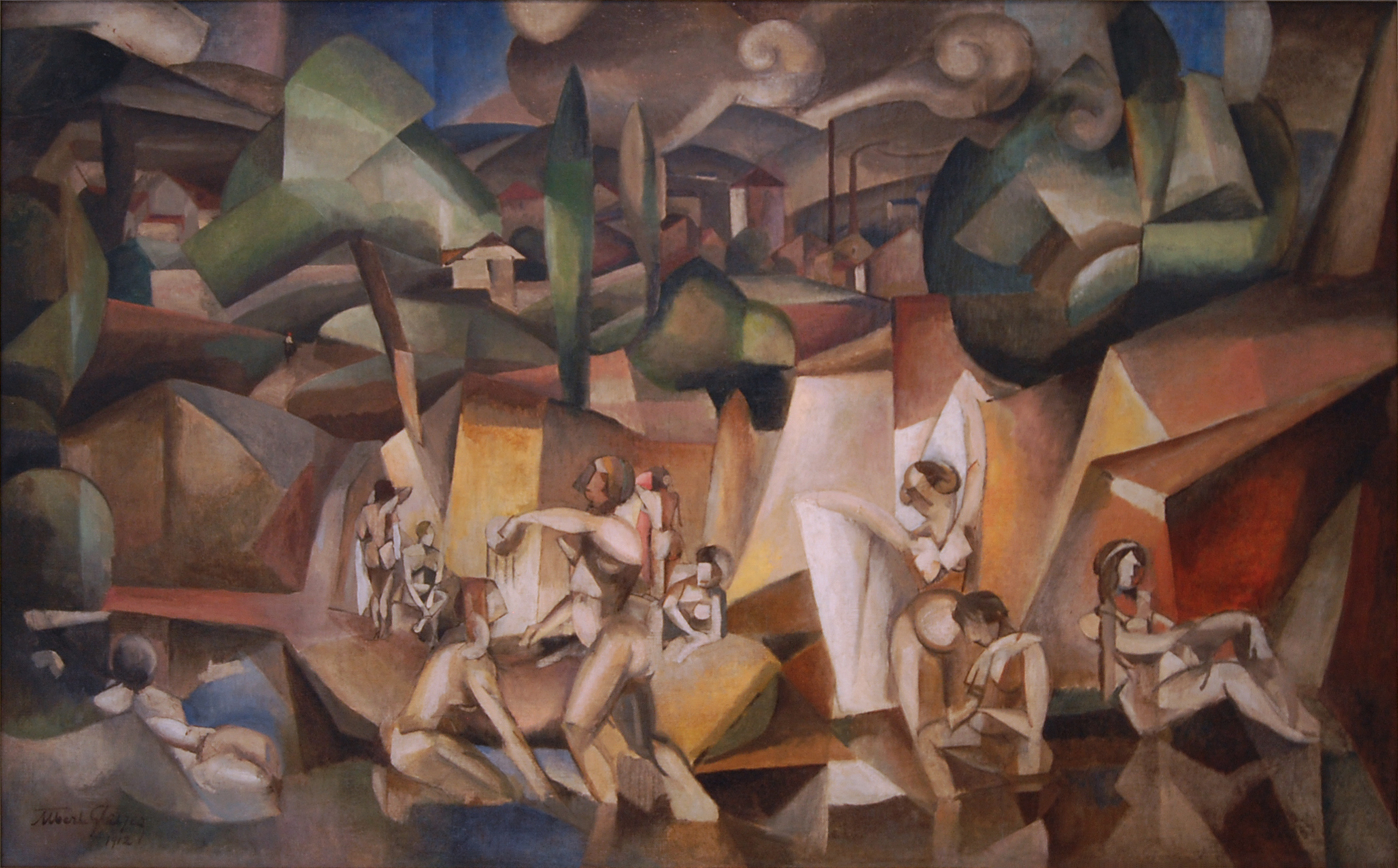
Albert Gleizes, 1912, Les Baigneuses (The Bathers), oil on canvas, 105 x 171 cm, Musée d'Art Moderne de la Ville de Paris

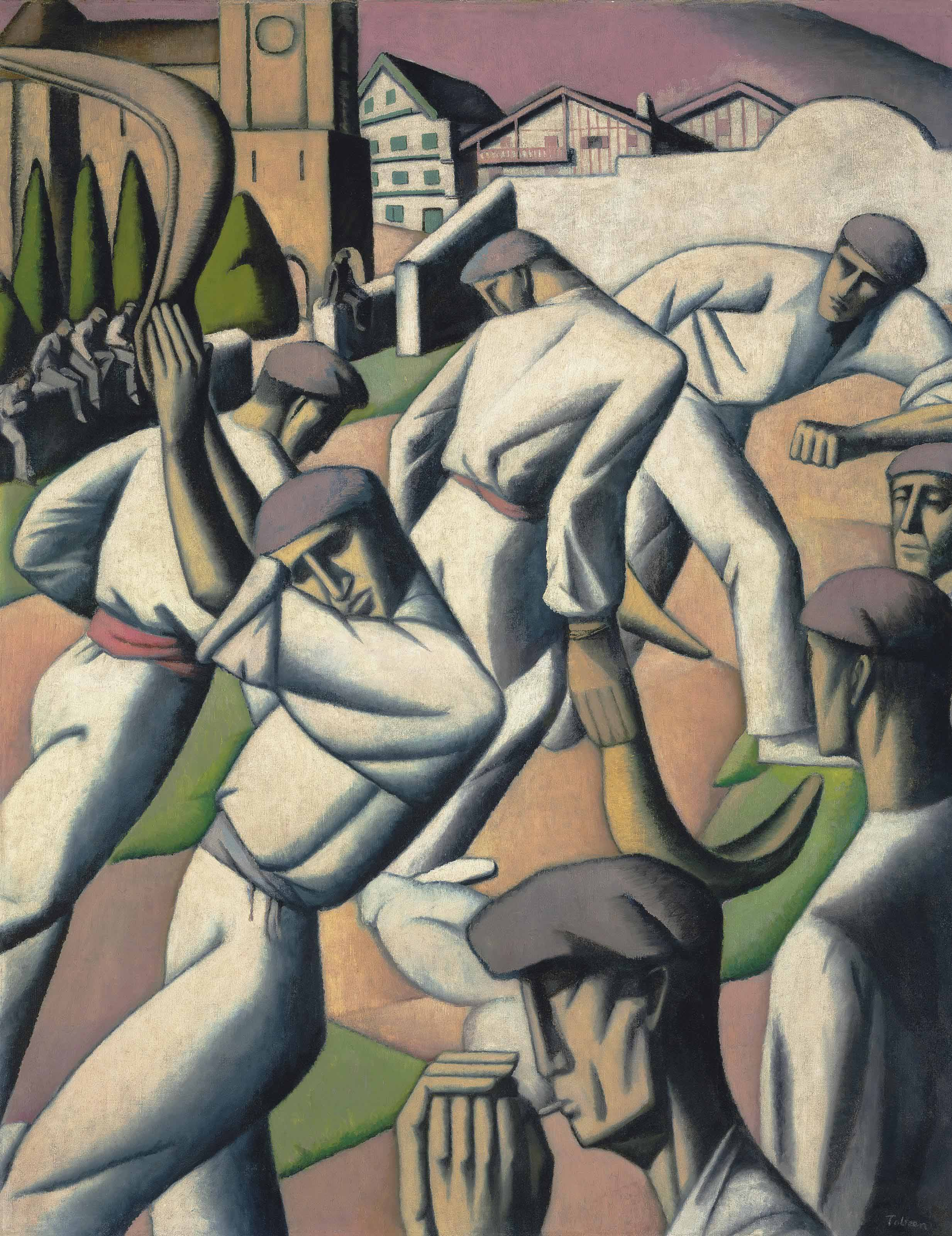
Tobeen, 1912, Pelotaris, oil on canvas, 147.5 x 115.5 cm

== Literature ==
- Exposition d'art contemporain (Société normande de peinture moderne) 2eme exposition, Galerie d'art ancien & d'art contemporain, 1911
- The Société Normande de Peinture Moderne, Christina Stuart Ross Southam - 1970
- Fernand Léger: [Exposición] The Museum of Modern Art, New York, Carolyn Lanchner - 1998
- Cubism and Its Histories, David Cottington - 2004
- Les Fauves: A Sourcebook, Russell T. Clement - 1994
- Ruptures, continuités, Yves Vadé - 2000
- Architecture and Cubism, Eve Blau, Nancy J. Troy - 2002
- Women in Dada: Essays on Sex, Gender, and Identity, Naomi Sawelson-Gorse - 2001
- Marcel Duchamp, Caroline Cros - 2006
- Movement, Manifesto, Melee: The Modernist Group, 1910-1914, Milton A. Cohen - 2004
- Fernand Léger 1911-1924: the rhythm of modern life, Dorothy M. Kosinski, Christoph Asendorf - 1994
- Marcel Duchamp: Appearance Stripped Bare, Octavio Paz - 1990
- Marcel Duchamp, respirateur, Kornelia von Berswordt-Wallrabe, Staatliches Museum Schwerin - 1999
- Marcel Duchamp: Plan pour écrire une vie de Marcel Duchamp, Jennifer Gough-Cooper, Jacques Caumont, Musée national d'art moderne (France) - 1977
- Retrospective 1886-1943: Robert-A. Pinchon, Issue 1, B. Du Chatenet - 1971
- Une ville pour l'impressionnisme: Monet, Pissarro et Gauguin... Laurent Salomé - 2010
- Jacques Villon: exposition, Musée des beaux-arts, Rouen, 14... Hélène Lassalle, Jacques Villon, Rouen (France). Musée des beaux arts - 1975
- A Cubism Reader: Documents and Criticism, 1906-1914, Mark Antliff, Patricia Dee Leighten - 2008
- Répertoire d'art et d'archéologie, 1969
- Cubism in the Shadow of War: The Avant-garde and Politics in Paris 1905-1914, David Cottington - 1998
- Léger: Biographical and Critical Study, Robert L. Delevoy - 1962
- Tempus fugit, time flies, Jan Schall, Nelson-Atkins Museum of Art - 2000
- From Van Gogh to Picasso, from Kandinsky to Pollock: Masterpieces of Modern Art, Thomas Krens, Germano Celant, Lisa Dennison - 1990
- I primi passi di Gertrude Stein: Three lives... Emanuela Gutkowski - 2004
- Handbook, the Peggy Guggenheim Collection, 1983
- From Picasso to Pollock: Modern Art from the Guggenheim Museum, Solomon R. Guggenheim Museum - 2003
- Painters of the Section D'Or: The Alternatives to Cubism, Albright-Knox Art Gallery - 1967
- Orphism: the evolution of non-figurative painting in Paris, 1910-1914, Virginia Spate - 1979
- Las vanguardias artísticas en España, 1909-1936, Jaime Brihuega - 1981
- L'Euphorie: Arts plastiques- Cinéma- Philosophie, 2000
- The Popular Culture of Modern Art: Picasso, Duchamp, and Avant-gardism, Jeffrey S. Weiss - 1994
- Theodore Earl Butler: Emergence from Monet's Shadow, Richard H. Love - 1985
- A. Dunoyer de Segonzac, Anne Distel - 1980
- The Cubist Painters, Guillaume Apollinaire, Peter Read - 2004
- Cubism, José Pierre - 1969
