= Jean-Baptiste de Milcent =

French playwright and journalist

Jean-Baptiste Gabriel Marie de Milcent (28 June 1747, Paris 1833, Paris) was a French playwright and journalist.

Raised by the Jesuits, he directed the Journal d'agriculture for twenty years. On 5 January 1785, he established the Journal ou Annales de Normandie, biweekly until 30 December 1789, which he renamed the Journal de Normandie, ou de Rouen 18 June 1790 and which appeared three times a week until October 31, 1790, then daily from November 1790 to 11 May 1791. Returning to Paris at the outbreak of the Revolution, he became secretary of the Académie royale de musique in 1795.

Familiar with Diderot, d’Alembert and Marie-Thérèse Geoffrin, he composed lyrical tragedies, some of which, such as Les Deux Statues, had a great success..

He was a member of the Académie des sciences, belles-lettres et arts de Rouen.

== Literature ==
- 1775: Le Dix-huitième Siècle vengé, épître à M.D.***, La Haye, [s.n.]
- 1776: Azor & Zimeo, conte moral; followed by Thiamis, conte indien, Paris, Merigot jeune
- 1778: La Prise de Jéricho, oratorio, Paris : P. Delormel
- 1785: Les Deux Frères, two-act comedy, Paris: Cailleau
- 1786: Agnes Bernau, pièce héroïque in four acts and in free verse, Rouen, Boucher
- 1793: Les Deux Statues, one-act comedy, Rouen, Vve L. Dumesnil et Montier
- 1800: Praxitelle ou La ceinture, one-act opera, Paris, Ballard
- 1801: Hécube, three-act tragédie lyrique, Paris, Ballard
- 1807: Les Deux Statues, opéra comique in one act and in prose, Paris
- 1813: Médée et Jason, three-act tragédie-lyrique, Paris, Ballard
- 1825: Lord Davenant, drama in four acts and in prose, Paris, J.-N. Barba

== Publications on agronomy ==
- La Chaumière des champs, ou nouveau Traité d’agriculture pratique générale, dédié aux cultivateurs et aux amis des arts; ouvrage utile aux administrations, aux propriétaires et à toutes les personnes qui s’intéressent à l’amélioration et aux progrès de l’art de l’agriculture, Paris, Impr. de Delaguette, 1820, in-12, 48 p.
- Nouveaux éléments d’agronomie et de physique végétal..., Paris, Mme Huzard, 1822, in-12, 96 p.

== Journalism ==
- Journal de Normandie, 1785-30 December 1789, Rouen, Vve Laurent Dumesnil
- Journal ou Annales de Normandie, no. 1-72, year 1790, Rouen, Vve Laurent Dumesnil
- Journal de Normandie, ou de Rouen, et du Département de la Seine inférieure, 18 June 1790 – 11 May 1791, Rouen, Vve Laurent Dumesnil
- Journal de Rouen, et du Département de la Seine inférieure, 12 May 1791 – 27 October 1795, Rouen, Vve Laurent Dumesnil
