= Robert Antoine Pinchon =

French Post-Impressionist landscape painter

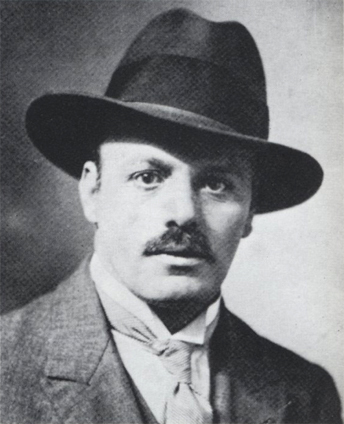
- Photograph of the artist
- Born: 1 July 1886; Rouen, France
- Died: 9 January 1943 (aged 56); Bois-Guillaume, France
- Education: Lycée Corneille à Rouen, École des Beaux-Arts de Rouen
- Known for: Painting
- Movement: Post-Impressionism, Divisionism, Fauvism, École de Rouen

Robert Antoine Pinchon (French pronunciation: [ʁɔbɛʁ ɑ̃twan pɛ̃ʃɔ̃], 1 July 1886 in Rouen – 9 January 1943 in Bois-Guillaume) was a French Post-Impressionist landscape painter of the Rouen School (l'École de Rouen) who was born and spent most of his life in France. He was consistent throughout his career in his dedication to painting landscapes en plein air (i.e., outdoors). From the age of nineteen (1905 to 1907) he worked in a Fauve style but never deviated into Cubism, and, unlike others, never found that Post-Impressionism did not fulfill his artistic needs. Claude Monet referred to him as "a surprising touch in the service of a surprising eye".

Among his important works are a series of paintings of the River Seine, mostly around Rouen, and landscapes depicting places in or near Upper Normandy.

== Early life ==
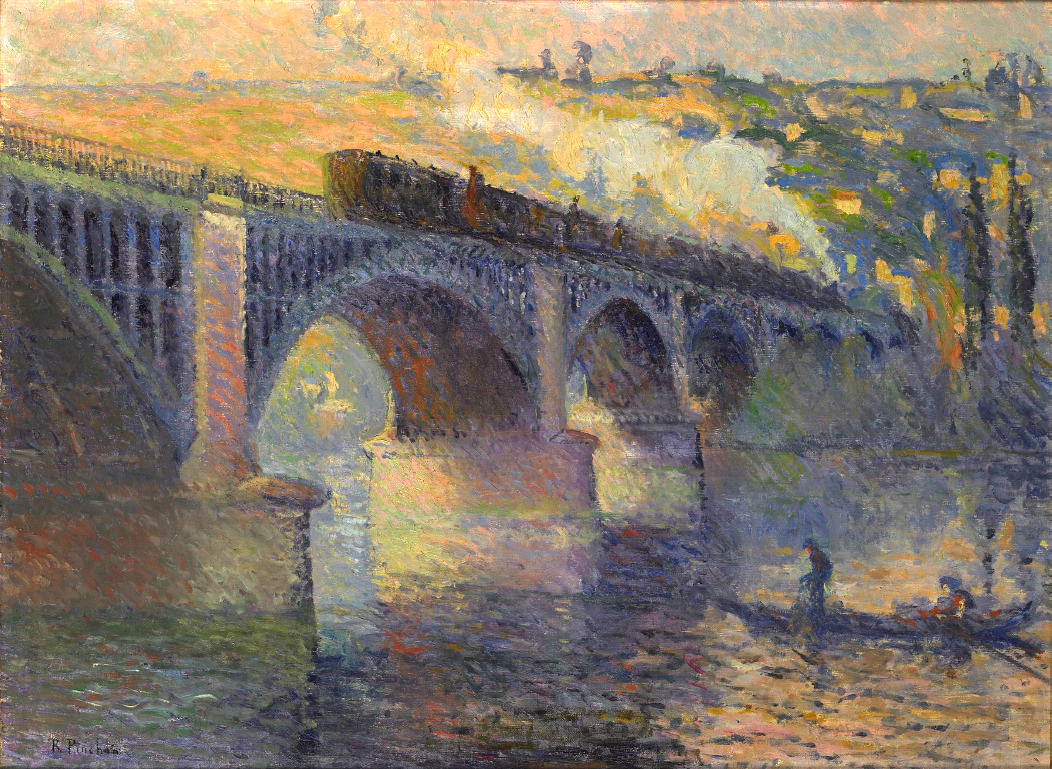
Robert Antoine Pinchon, Le Pont aux Anglais, soleil couchant, 1905, oil on canvas, 54 × 73 cm, Musée des Beaux-Arts de Rouen

Robert Antoine Pinchon was born into an artistic and literary environment. His father, Robert Pinchon, a librarian, journalist, playwright and drama critic, was an intimate friend of Guy de Maupassant and also became a close protégé of Gustave Flaubert. Maupassant and Robert Pinchon (La Tôque, as they called him) co-wrote in 1875 a script for a play entitled Á la Feuille de Rose, Maison Turque, on the subject of eroticism and prostitution. The piece was presented officially on 15 May 1877 at the studio of Maurice Leloir, in front of Gustave Flaubert, Émile Zola, Ivan Turgenev and eight elegantly dressed masked women.

Since his son showed early signs of interest and aptitude in the arts, Robert Antoine's father purchased a box of oil paints and accompanied him on long Sunday painting walks. An 1898 photograph shows him painting at the age of twelve. He exhibited some of his first paintings in 1900 at fourteen years of age.

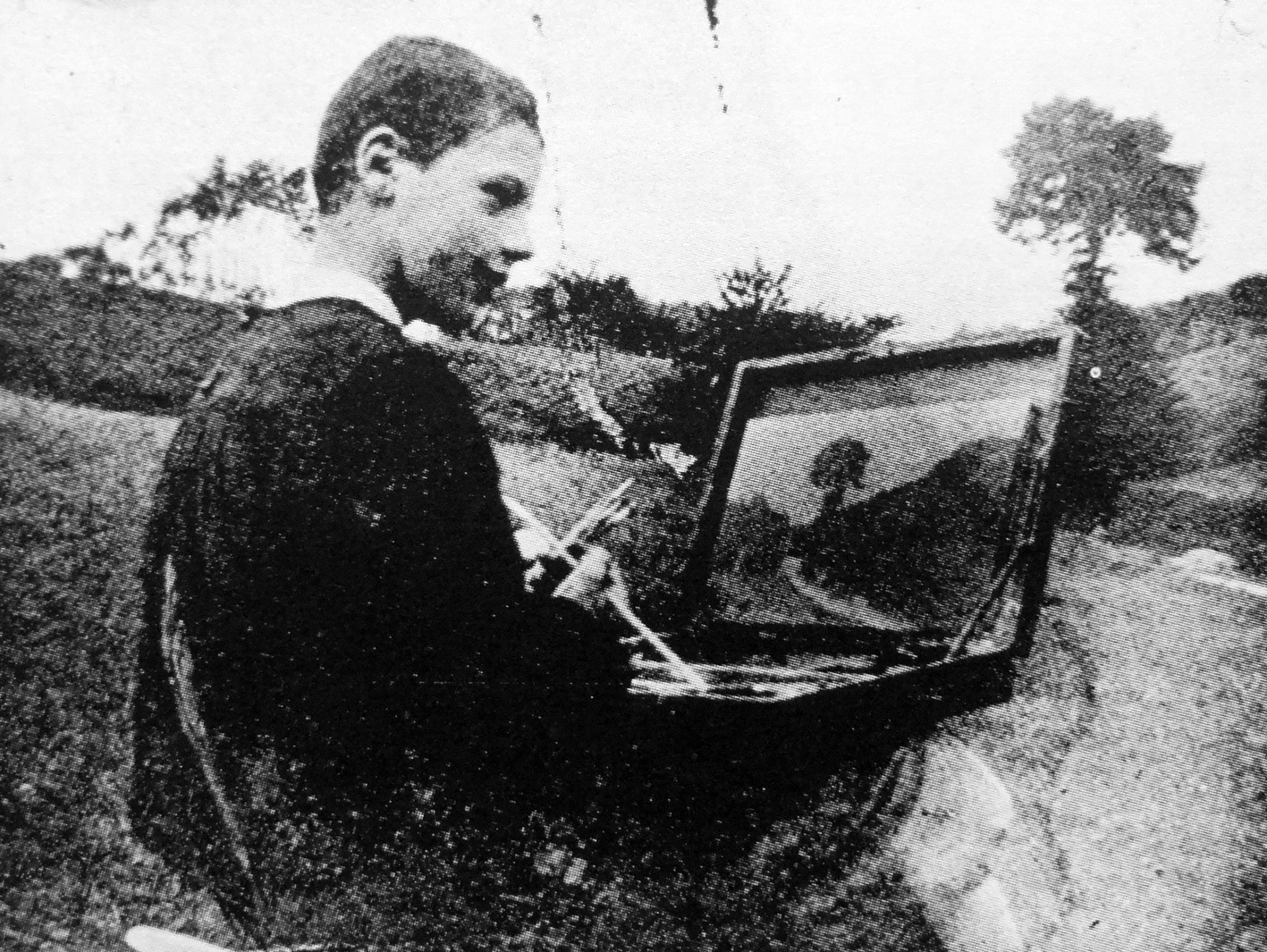
Robert Antoine Pinchon, 1898, painting Le chemin, oil on canvas, 22 × 32 cm

In 1900 Robert Antoine exhibited a painting in the storefront of a camera supply store owned by Dejonghe and Dumont in the rue de la République, one of the principal arteries of central Rouen. Though not a typical showspace, it was nonetheless visible to the public and located only a few meters from l'Hôtel du Dauphin et d'Espagne, known for its exhibitions of artists such as Gauguin, Monet, Pissarro, Degas, Renoir, Cézanne, Guillaumin and Sisley. The art critic Georges Dubosc wrote an article about Pinchon's painting in Le Journal de Rouen (16 March 1900).

== Education ==
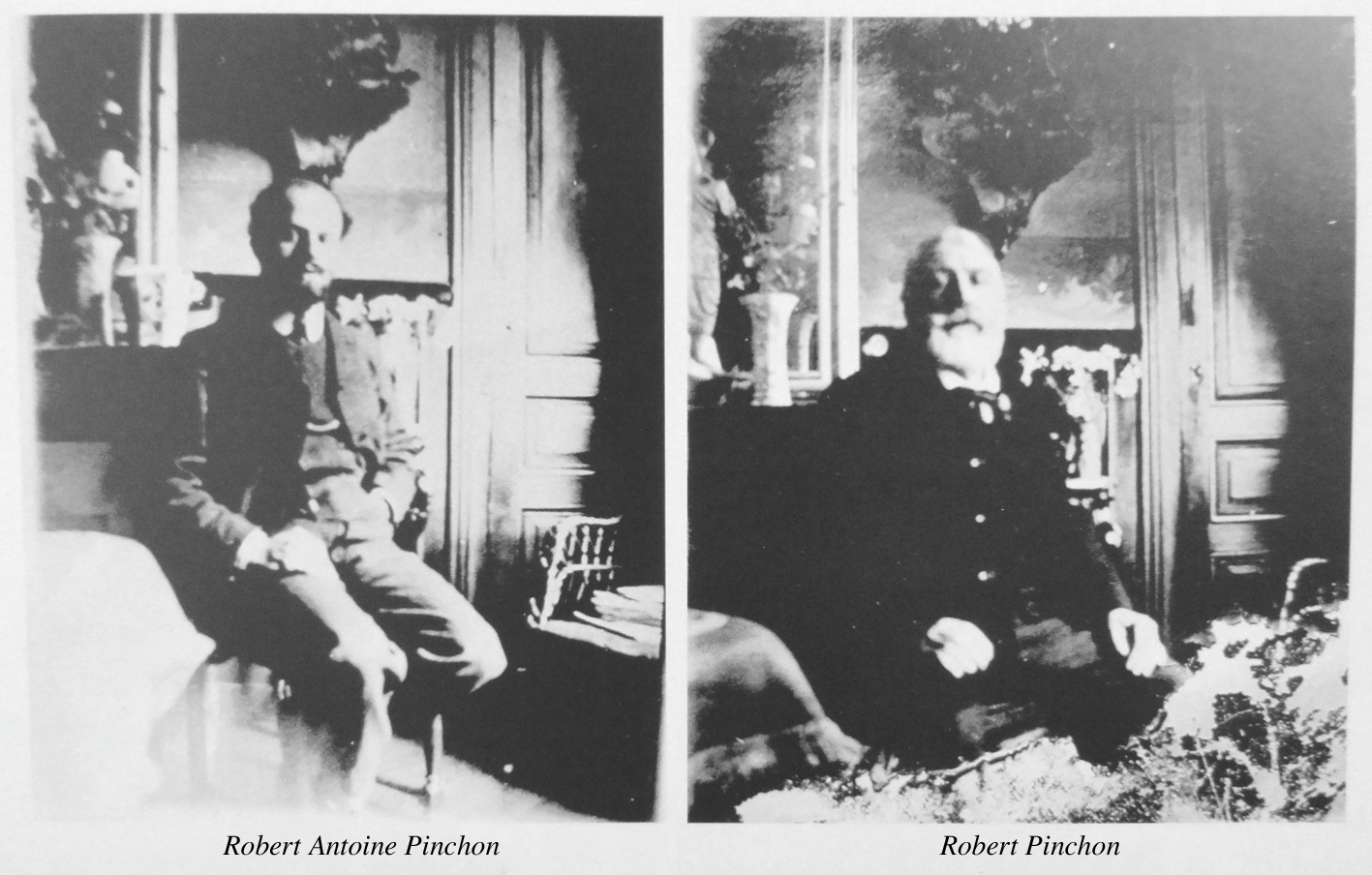
Robert Antoine Pinchon (left) and his father Robert Pinchon (right)

Robert Antoine Pinchon studied at Lycée Pierre-Corneille in Rouen at the turn of the century. Two other students in his class also became well-known artists and lasting friends: Marcel Duchamp and Pierre Dumont. Drawing classes at the Lycée were given by the stern and rigorous Philippe Zacharie (1849–1915), who became assistant professor of the school in 1874. In 1879, Zacharie was named professor at the Académie de Peinture et de Dessin, which would later become the École Régionale des Beaux-Arts de Rouen.

In addition to the academic training of the Beaux-Arts, Pinchon frequented the Académie libre that had been founded in 1895-96 by Joseph Delattre (1858-1912) in the rue des Charrettes, a rallying point for independent artists of the new generation of l'École de Rouen.

== Career ==
=== 1903–1914 ===
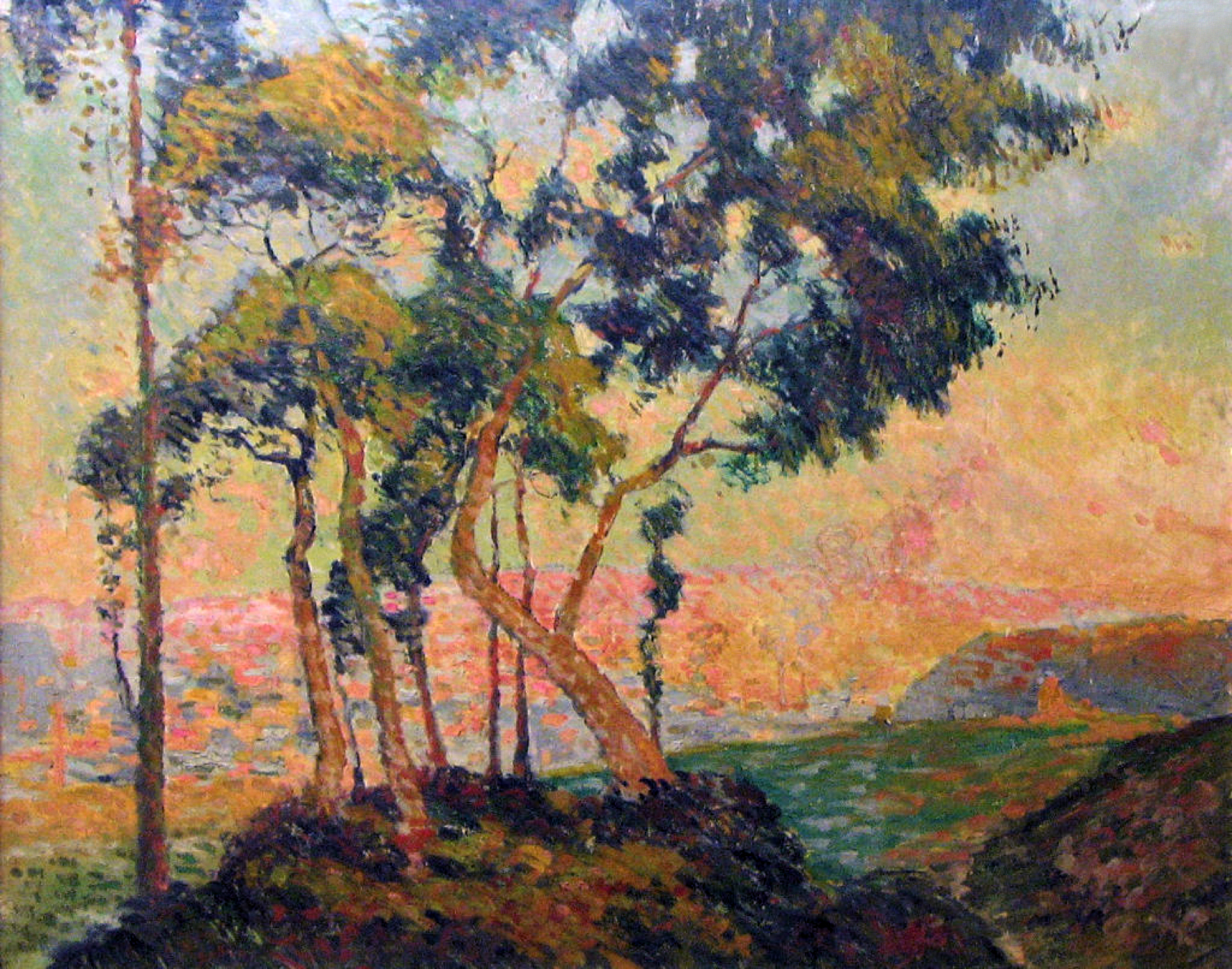
Robert Antoine Pinchon, Vue prise au Mont-Gargan soleil couchant, (before 1909) oil on canvas, 65 × 81 cm, Musée des Beaux-Arts de Rouen

In February 1903 Marcel Duchamps painted a portrait of his friend Robert Antoine Pinchon (reproduced in François Lespinasse, 2007, p. 18). From 15 June to 31 July, at the Salon Municipal des Beaux-arts de Rouen, Pinchon exhibited two paintings: La Lande à Petit-Couronne and La Seine à Croisset. The art critic Charles Hilbert Dufour wrote an article in which he makes favourable mention of the entries by Pinchon, who was still only 17.

At the 1903 Exposition des Beaux Arts held in Rouen from 14 May to 15 July, Robert Antoine Pinchon exhibited with Charles Frechon, Blanche Hoschedé-Monet and Claude Monet, who presented La Cathédrale de Rouen. Pinchon's work was noticed by Impressionist art collector François Depeaux (1853–1920), at whose home he had the opportunity to converse many times with Albert Lebourg, Camille Pissarro and Claude Monet; Monet characterized him as "a surprising touch in the service of a surprising eye" (étonnante patte au service d'un oeil surprenant).

Encouraged by Monet's praise, François Depeaux decided to take charge of the young artist's career; at first by purchasing several of Pinchon's works. This was the beginning of a relationship that would last until 1920.

In 1904 Pinchon designed the cover of a program for the Theatre Normand. The occasion was for a play by Guy de Maupassant. From 18 July to 18 September Pinchon exhibited, this time alongside Luce, Lebourg and Camoin, at the Casino de Dieppe. At the age of nineteen, while still a student at l'École des Beaux-Arts, he had his first major exhibition; at the Galerie Legrip, Rouen, 27 April–13 May 1905, with twenty-four paintings on display. Two articles in the press followed (La Dépêche de Rouen, 16 April, and Journal de Rouen, 28 April).

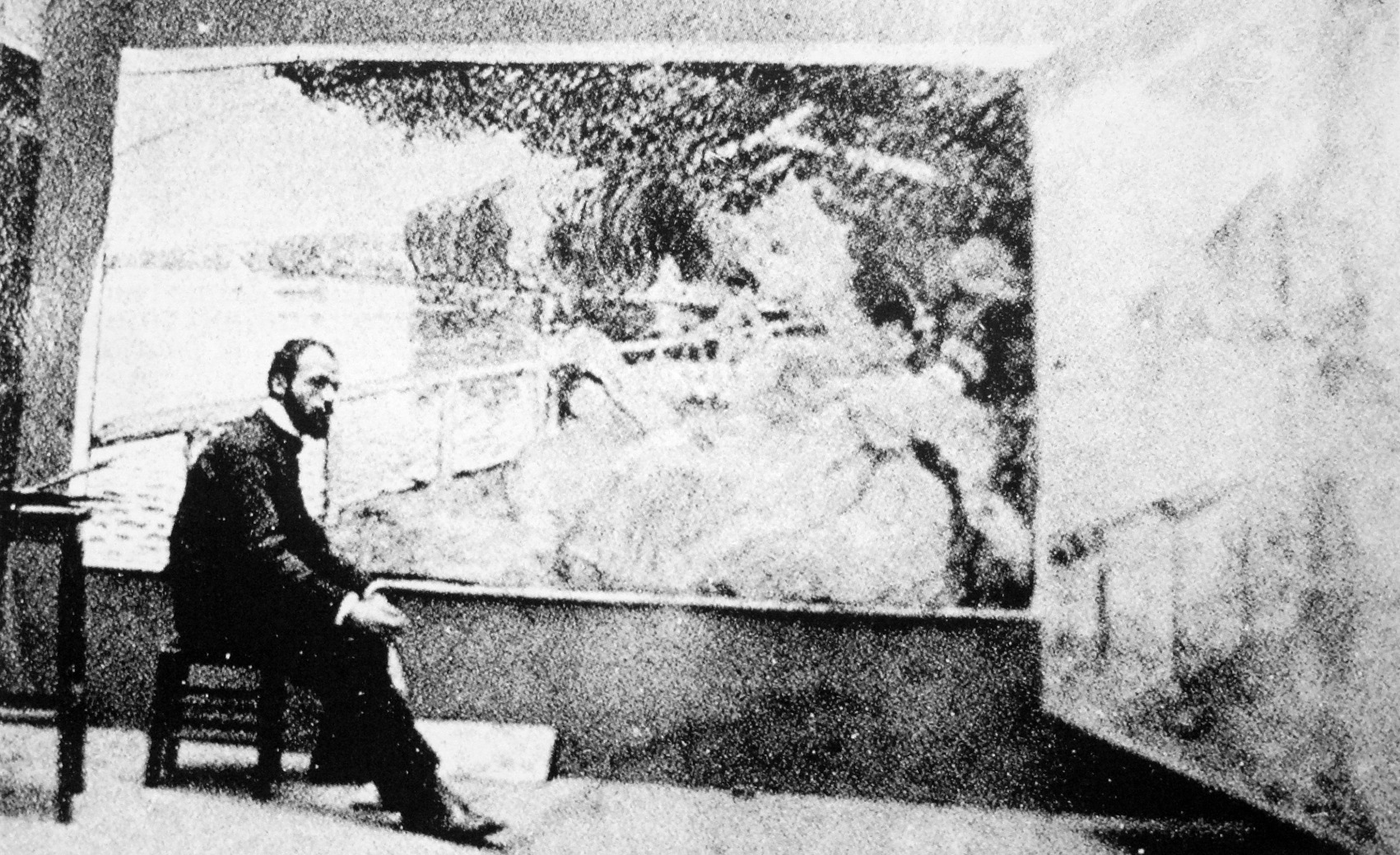
Robert Antoine Pinchon, 1906, in front of La Bouille (Restaurant champêtre de La Bouille), panel for L'Alhambra-Théâtre. The oil painting, measuring 250 cm × 500 cm (98.5 in × 197 in) is seen on the right of the photograph facing the artist. The study for the work is behind the artist.

The same year Robert Antoine Pinchon showed in Paris for the first time. The occasion was the 1905 Salon d'Automne (18 October to 25 November), an exhibition that witnessed the birth of Fauvism. "A pot of paint has been flung in the face of the public," wrote the critic Camille Mauclair. Louis Vauxcelles coined the phrase les fauves ('the wild beasts') to describe a circle of painters exhibiting in the same room as a classical sculpture. He stated his criticism of their works by describing the sculpture as "a Donatello amongst wild beasts" (Donatello chez les fauves). Another art critic responding to the Salon d'Automne, Marcel Nicolle, wrote in the Journal de Rouen on 20 November that these works have "no relation to painting" and compared them to "the barbaric and naïve games of a child who plays with a box of colors". Of Pinchon's three paintings (Le Pont Transbordeur à Rouen, Le Pont de Boieldieu, à Rouen, Vieilles Cabanes dans l'Île Lacroix, à Rouen) he wrote: "Showing for his first time in Paris... the technique is a bit heavy, but we shouldn't be too severe toward a beginner, especially after what we saw elsewhere in the Salon". Though Pinchon had not exhibited in room VII with the fauves, his palette was already pure and his impasto thick.

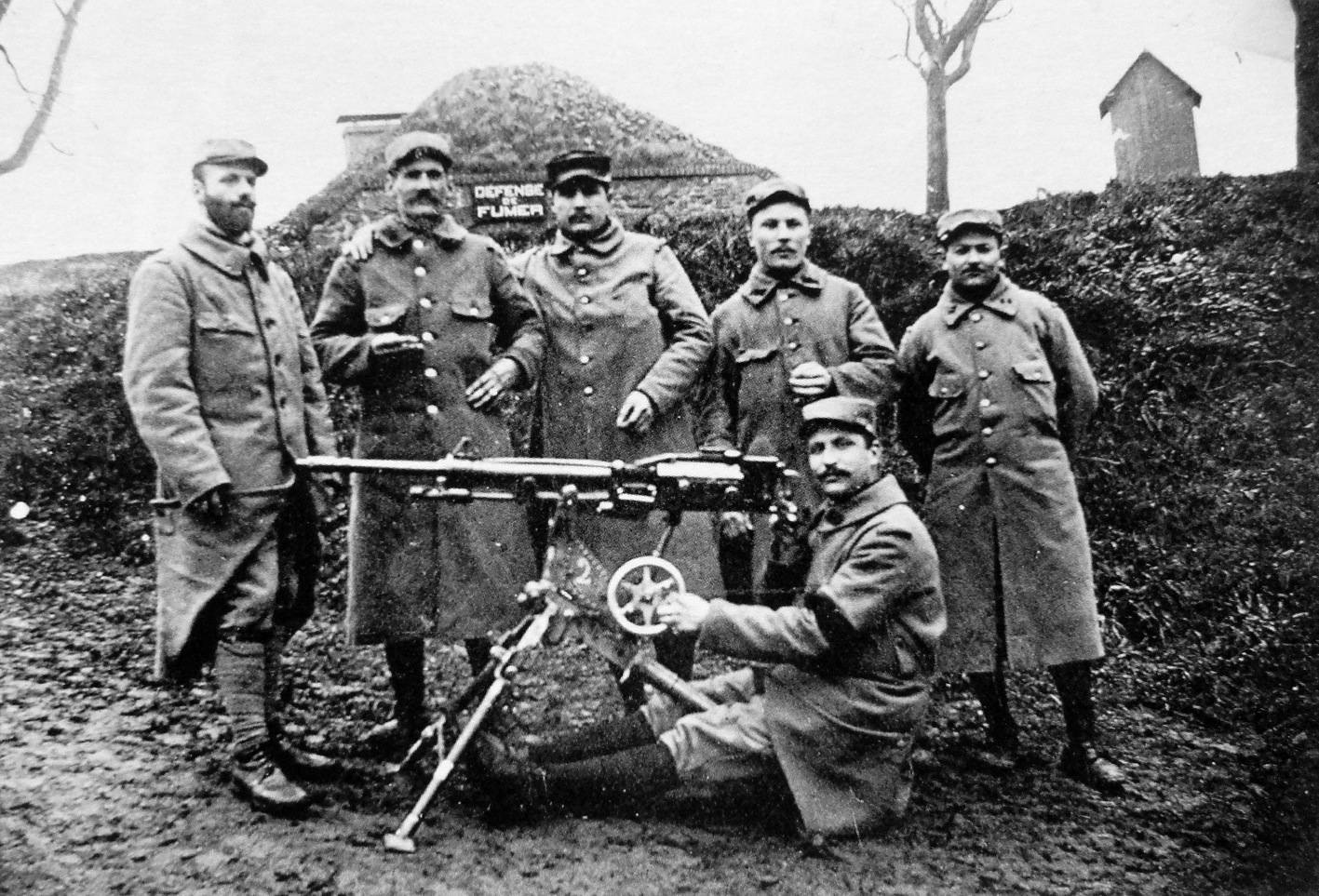
Robert Antoine Pinchon (left) during World War I

On 31 September 1906 Pinchon joined the 39th Infantry Regiment. Marcel Duchamp had just finished his military service with the same regiment.

In 1906 Pinchon showed again in Paris, at the 4th Salon d'Automne: Prairies inondées (Saint-Etienne-du-Rouvray, près de Rouen), (no. 1367 of the catalogue) Musée de Louviers, Eure His paintings of this period are closely related to the Post-Impressionist and Fauvist styles, with golden yellows, incandescent blues, a thick impasto and larger brushstrokes.

At the instigation of Pierre Dumont and inspired by Othon Friesz's group called Le Cercle de l'Art Moderne, in Le Havre, the group XXX (thirty) was formed as a collective of independent writers, painters and sculptors from the vicinity of Rouen, including Matisse, Derain, Dufy and Vlaminck contributing to the endeavor. Pinchon joined XXX that year. The group published a "manifesto" called "Almanach pour 1908" and included artists typically associated with the new generation of l'École de Rouen.

Robert Antoine Pinchon's first solo exhibition in Paris took place on 15–25 March 1909 at the Galerie des Artistes Modernes run by Chaine and Simonson, with thirty works listed in the catalogue. The show resulted in both sales and press coverage. This was followed by another show at the Galerie Legrip in Rouen on 30 June. A few months later, on 13 November, the Musée des Beaux-Arts de Rouen opened a show with fifty-two paintings: three by Monet, nine by Sisley, three by Guillaumin, one by Renoir, thirteen by Lebourg, five by Delattre, two by Fréchon and four by Robert Antoine Pinchon.

In 1909 Pinchon, Dumont, Hodé and Tirvert founded the "Société Normande de Peinture Moderne," which attracted the participation of Braque, Matisse, Dufy, Vlaminck, Derain, Marquet, Friesz, Picabia, and La Fresnaye. The same year, when he was still only 23 years old, four paintings by Pinchon entered the collection of the Musée des Beaux-Arts de Rouen.

1910 was a prolific year for Pinchon. A succession of shows followed: Galerie Legrip in Rouen (May), Galerie de Mme Le Bas, in Le Havre (July), and the 3rd exposition of the Société Normande de la Peinture Moderne (15 June–15 July): Here Pinchon showed twelve works alongside Dufy, Lhote, Léger, Gleizes, Gris, Picabia and Duchamp. Pinchon's next show on record was at the 8th Salon des artistes rouennais, 1913, followed by the 4th exposition of the Société Normande de la Peinture, the same year. Amongst the members of the selection committee were Jacques Villon, Duchamp-Villon and Francis Picabia. The organizational committee included Marcel Duchamp and Robert Antoine Pinchon.

Pinchon would participate in two more exhibitions during the first half of 1914. A catalogue was printed for one of these shows, entitled L'École de Rouen, ses peintres et ses ferronniers. In parallel was the 5th and last exhibition of the Société Normande de la Peinture Moderne, which included works by Utrillo, Friesz, Guillaumin, Luce, Vlaminck and Pinchon.

=== World War I ===
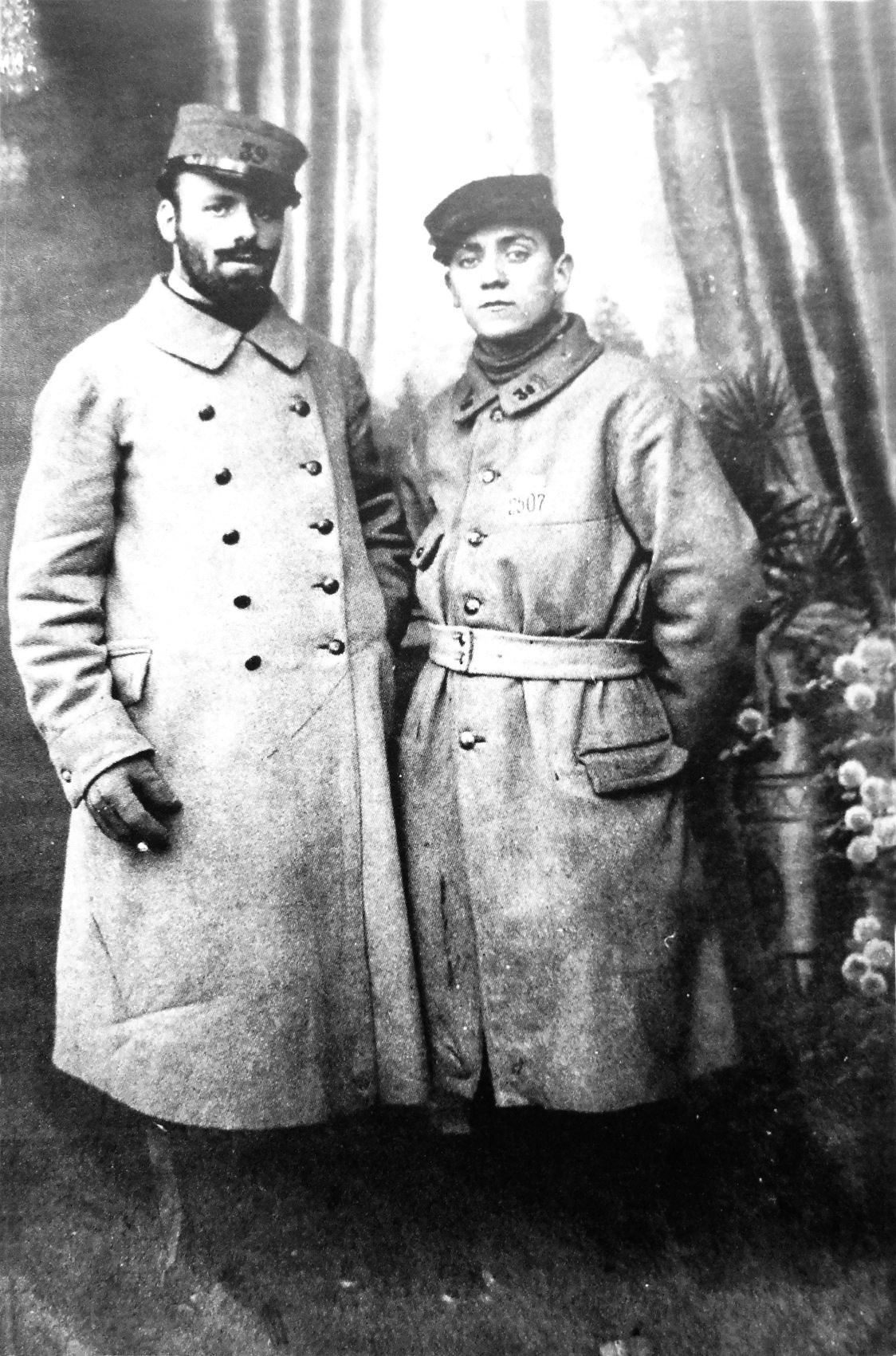
Robert Antoine Pinchon (left) and a friend as prisoners of war in World War I, Germany c. 1917

The declaration of war in 1914 signaled a major break in European cultural history, and a major break in the life and career of Robert Antoine Pinchon, who was mobilised on 5 August 1914 at Bernay. Pinchon was wounded in his right leg by a German mortar discharge during the First Battle of the Marne and was repatriated to a hospital in Saint-Céré. Once recovered, he was sent back to the front lines, but during fierce fighting in the village of Tahure on 6 October Pinchon was wounded, this time by shrapnel to the right arm.

Early in 1916, Pinchon was sent back to the front for the second time. After several unsuccessful offensive assaults, the Germans were able to gain control of the French coast near Damloup. Robert Antoine Pinchon became a prisoner of war and was evacuated to Gerichshain, Germany (east of Leipzig). His father arranged for a painting of his to be shown at the 9th Salon des artistes rouennais (April–May 1917). Pinchon remained a prisoner in Germany from autumn 1916 until autumn 1918, but was able to create several pastels while in captivity. Meanwhile, works by Pinchon were shown again at the Galerie Legrip in Rouen.

During this difficult period, one of Pinchon's paintings (Le coteau d'Amfreville, près Rouen) was exhibited at the Musée du Jeu de Paume in Paris, in a 1917 show dedicated to artists who had died in the war, prisoners of war, and those still in combat: Exposition des peintres aux Armées.

On a date that remains unknown, Pinchon was able to escape captivity. After passing through Switzerland, Italy, and a large section of France, he was able to reach his hometown of Rouen on 20 December 1918. At the same time, an exhibit was underway at the Musée des Beaux-Arts de Rouen. Pinchon was represented with four paintings, along with Bonnard, Boudin, Camoin, Cross, Guillaumin, Lebourg, Luce, Matisse, Monet, Signac and Vuillard. Pinchon was listed as a prisoner of war in the catalogue.

Like many of those who survived the Great War, Pinchon was shocked, disillusioned and embittered by his experiences. He expressed the view that his four years of military service and captivity had "shattered" his career. For four years in a row, he had been accepted at the Salon d'Automne but been unable to fulfill his entries. Pinchon faced difficult challenges, but returned to painting what he loved most: the great outdoors.

=== 1918–1923 ===
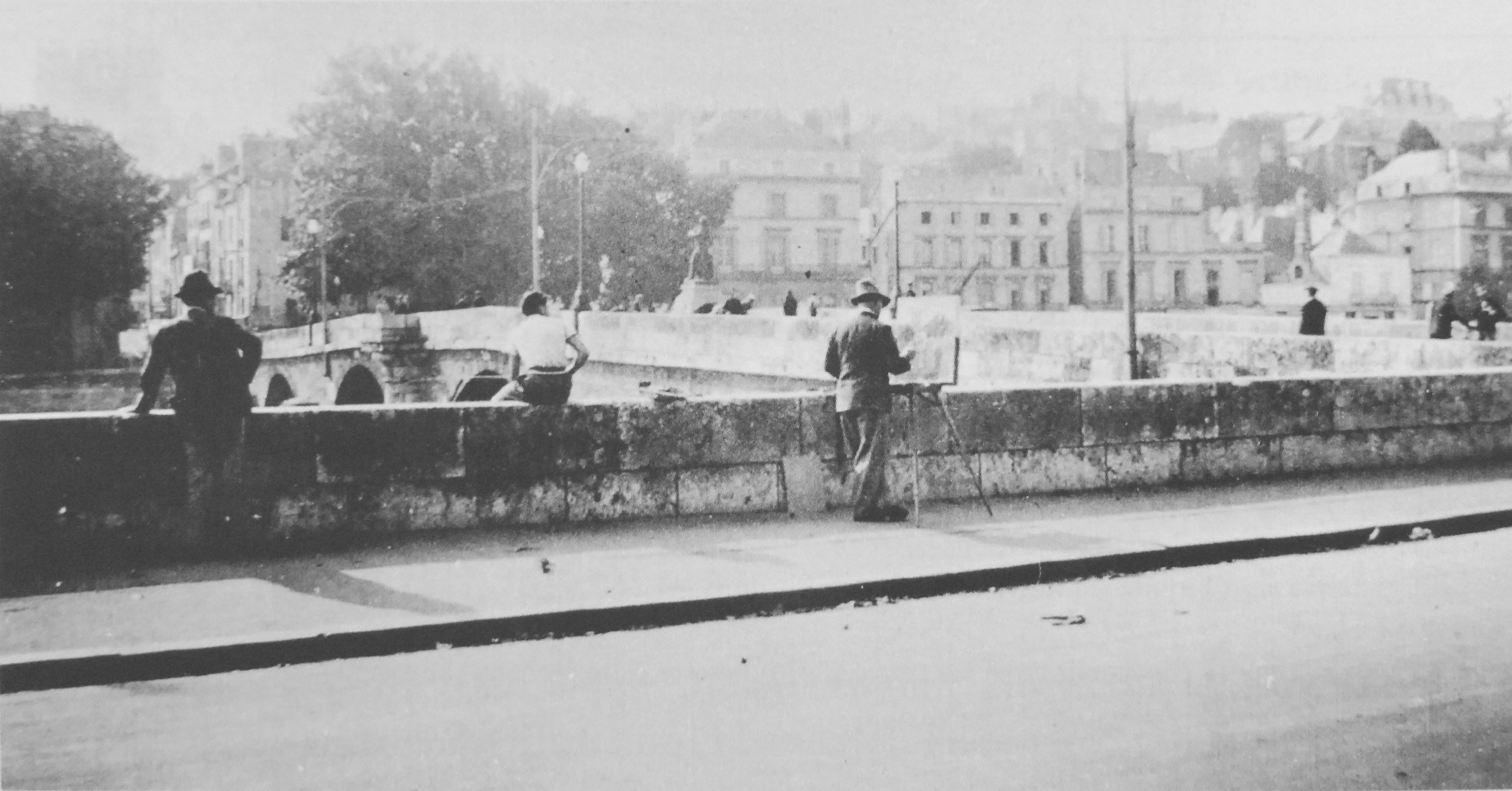
Robert Antoine Pinchon painting a bridge

Again reunited with his family and friends at 49 rue des Armand Carrel in Rouen, on 8 May 1919 Pinchon presented several works, including three that he had created as a prisoner of war, at the 10th Salon des artistes rouennais. These same works were shown again in Paris that October (at 40 rue Marbeuf). In November Pinchon was again showing at the Salon d'Automne in Paris. Several shows in Rouen would follow. On 24 January 1921 Robert Antoine Pinchon and Elise Louise Joséphine Bance were married, and in April Pinchon was showing both at the Galerie Legrip and at the Musée de Rouen (39th exposition of Beaux-Arts de Rouen) together with Bonnard, Martin, Lebourg, Marquet and Vuillard. In May of the same year Pinchon showed at the 11th Salon des artistes rouennais. In December 1922, his first son, Claude Pinchon, was born.

From 1923 onwards, to avoid confusion with another artist by the name of Robert Henri Pinchon, the artist signed his paintings Robert A. Pinchon.

=== 1924–1938 ===
In 1925 Pinchon became vice president of the 16th Salon de la Société des Artistes Rouennais et de Normandie.

In 1926 Pinchon again had a solo exhibition in Paris, this time at the Galerie A.M. Reitlinger, 12 rue La Boétie, with 45 paintings on display from 16 February to 4 March. One of the paintings on display was purchased by the State: Barque échouée, Saint-Valery-en-Caux. Meanwhile, back in Rouen, another exhibit at Galerie Legrip was about to showcase his works.

A short time after the Galerie Reitlinger show, a book was published by Julia Pillore, alias Léon de Saint-Valéry, an art critic, Marcel Duchamp's godmother, Lucie Duchamp's stepsister, and wife of the painter Paulin Bertrand. Julia Pillore was one of the first women in France to earn a university degree in philosophy. The 1926 book is entitled Tendances d'art; les formes peintes, les impressionnistes, les classiques, les tourmentés et les aberrés volontaires. Just before examining the technique of Paul Signac, Léon de Saint-Valéry elucidates some interesting aspects of Pinchon's oeuvre:

M. Pinchon, who by certain aspects of his method seems to proceed from Monet and Guillaumin, has nonetheless a very personal conception of formal pictorial design that his approach rigorously defines. Imaginative and sensitive, he admits only the visual realities that stimulate sensation. He does not attach significant importance to forms determined by contour lines; these are, in his eyes, the motif upon which the harmonies of color and light are arranged.

M. Pinchon is foremost a painter impassioned by light. It is the intervention of light that modifies the architecture of the countryside and determines the colors. None of the colors 'theoretically' observed in nature are present in his paintings; rather, all of the tonalities result from the influence of reflected light. The predominance of this intangible element in his scenes communicates an intense impression of life. In his landscapes of Rouen and its environs, streets, squares, rivers, fields, riverbanks, or cliffs, nothing is immobile or absolute. Movement is everywhere present, expressed or suggested: the multitude of changing reflected tones diversify the water, clouds populate the sky unpredictably; the fugitive temporal coloration, together, observed from a unique vantage-point give the impression of ten entirely different landscapes that animate the vibrant roseate of dusk, the delicate violates of twilight, the emerald green of the passing breeze, the soft grays of morning, the nacre iridescence of winter. (Léon de Saint-Valéry, 1926)

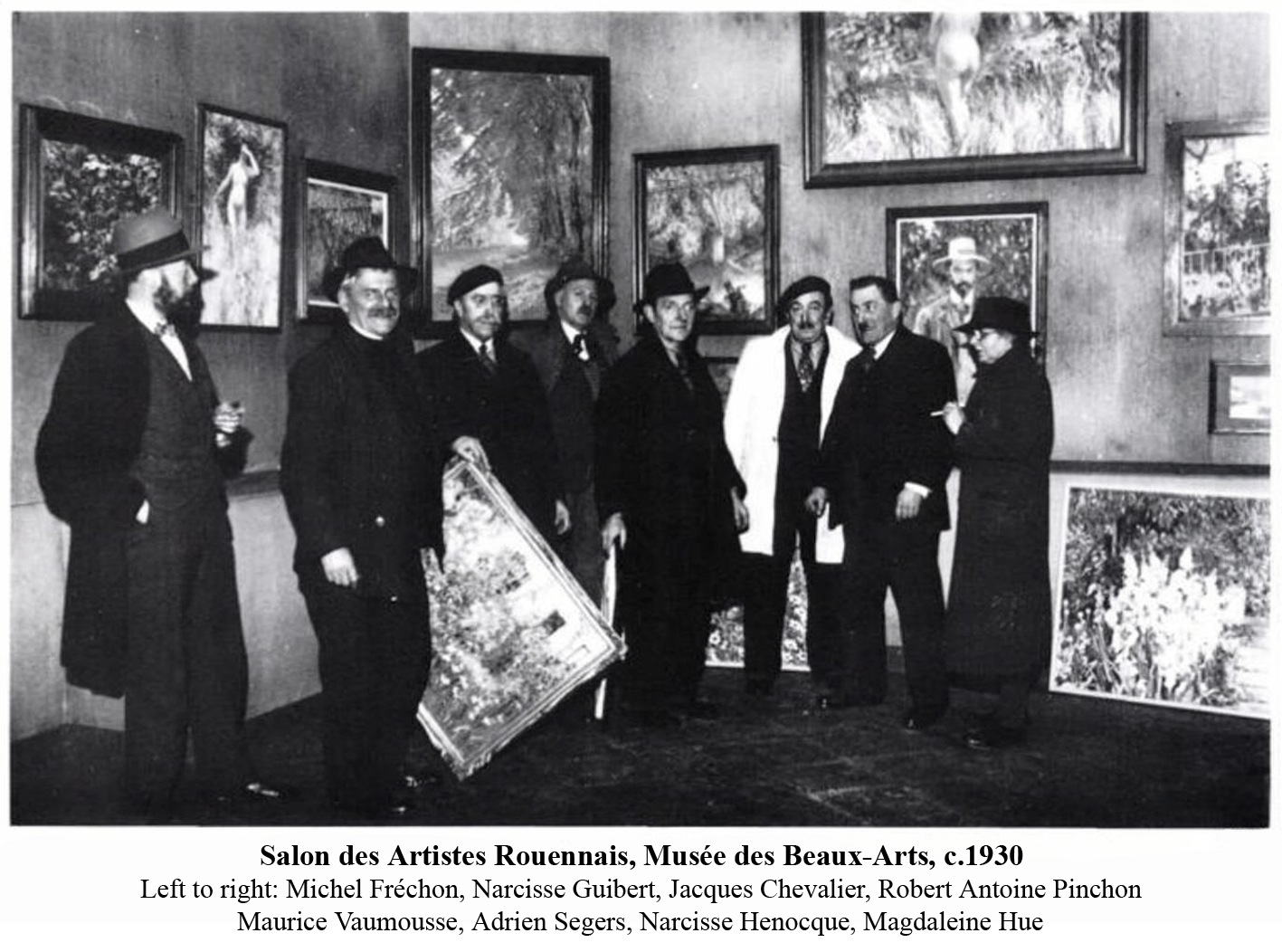
Salon des Artistes Rouennais, Musée des Beaux-Arts de Rouen, c.1930. Pinchon in standing fourth from the left

In Paris, from 26 January to 16 February 1929, the Galerie Reitlinger displayed 31 paintings and four drawings by R. A. Pinchon. And in May, Pinchon participated in the Salon des Artistes Français (the 142nd Exposition Officielle des Beaux-Arts at the Grand Palais Des Champs-Élysées). Simultaneously, his works were included in the 20th Salon des artistes rouennais.

Four months later the Great Depression would hit virtually every country, with devastating effects climaxing in Paris around 1931. Yet despite the bleak economic landscape, Pinchon became a member of the Société des Artistes Français (S.A.F.). Paul Chabas was president at the time and M. Reitlinger was in charge of distributing the awards for the works shown at the Salon, which opened on 18 February. Pinchon exhibited 30 paintings in the show at the Grand Palais.

In 1931 the Union des chambres de commerce maritimes et des ports français commissioned Pinchon to create a painting representing the Port of Rouen. This work, a triptych, was exhibited at the Paris Colonial Exposition, which was visited by over 33 million people from around the world. In addition to the commissioned work, Pinchon took the opportunity to collaborate with the poet Francis Yard in a publication dedicated to "La rivière, qui fait de ce quartier de Rouen comme une ignoble petite Venise", as Gustave Flaubert referred to it in Madame Bovary.

On 1 July 1932, Pinchon was admitted to the Académie des sciences, belles-lettres et arts de Rouen. He donated a painting entitled "Quai à Croisset" to the academy for the occasion.

In May 1935 a book by Lucie Delarue-Mardrus was published with 25 illustrations by Pinchon. Concurrently, at the Salon des artistes rouennais, Pinchon exhibited the large triptych he had painted for the Chamber of Commerce. Other artists represented at this show included Hubert Robert, Vernet, Cochin, Huet, Lepère, Monet, Lebourg and Martin. Pinchon was now President of the Salon des artistes rouennais.

In 1936, 1937 and 1938, Pinchon exhibited multiple times: at the 27th Salon des artistes rouennais (Rouen), Galerie Reitlinger (Paris), Galerie des Artistes Modernes (Paris), Maison the la Culture (Rouen), and three shows at Galerie Legrip (Rouen). He also illustrated both volumes of a book entitled Cathédrales et Eglises Normandes, published in 1936 and 1937 by the architect Pierre Chirol.

=== 1939–1943 ===
With another World War looming, 1939 was the beginning of a difficult period, not just for Pinchon and other artists, but for the vast majority of the world's nations. Pinchon was deeply saddened by the human folly that would lead to such a turn of events. Neither he nor anyone else could have imagined the human loss and destruction that would be unleashed on Rouen. Yet despite the carnage that followed, hope and optimism had not entirely vanished. The 30th Salon des artistes rouennais went ahead as scheduled, with its opening on 19 May 1940; however, due to the gravity of the situation, it was closed two days later. The first bombardment of the city began on 5 June, followed by a mass exodus. On 8 June at 10:00 p.m. the first German tanks rolled in on la route de Neufchatel, very close to the Pinchon residence.

Pinchon exhibited for the last time between 16 May and 15 June, at l'Hôtel de la Couronne, place du Vieux-Marché, Rouen. After this show, which despite difficult times was successful both in press coverage and sales, Pinchon participated in another publication: Rouen et l'Exode. This was a collaboration of twenty Normandy artists in aid of imprisoned artists.

Robert-Antoine Pinchon died on 3 January 1943 in Bois-Guillaume, France, at the age of 56.

== Honors ==
Four streets in the Seine-Maritime region of Normandy are named in commemoration of Robert Antoine Pinchon: in Barentin, Bois-Guillaume, Le Mesnil-Esnard and Pavilly. A square in Rouen (district of Saint-Clément – Jardin-des-Plantes) also bears his name.

== Paintings ==
Bridge scenes

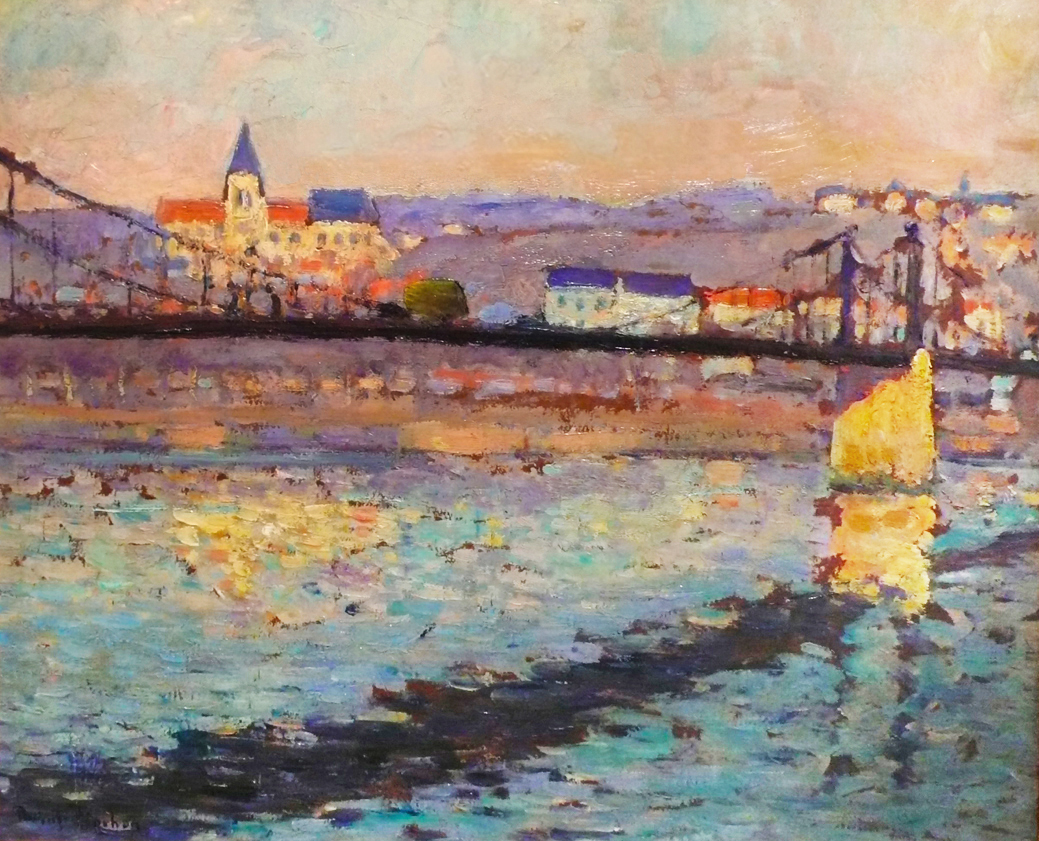
1904, Triel sur Seine, le pont du chemin de fer, 46 × 55 cm

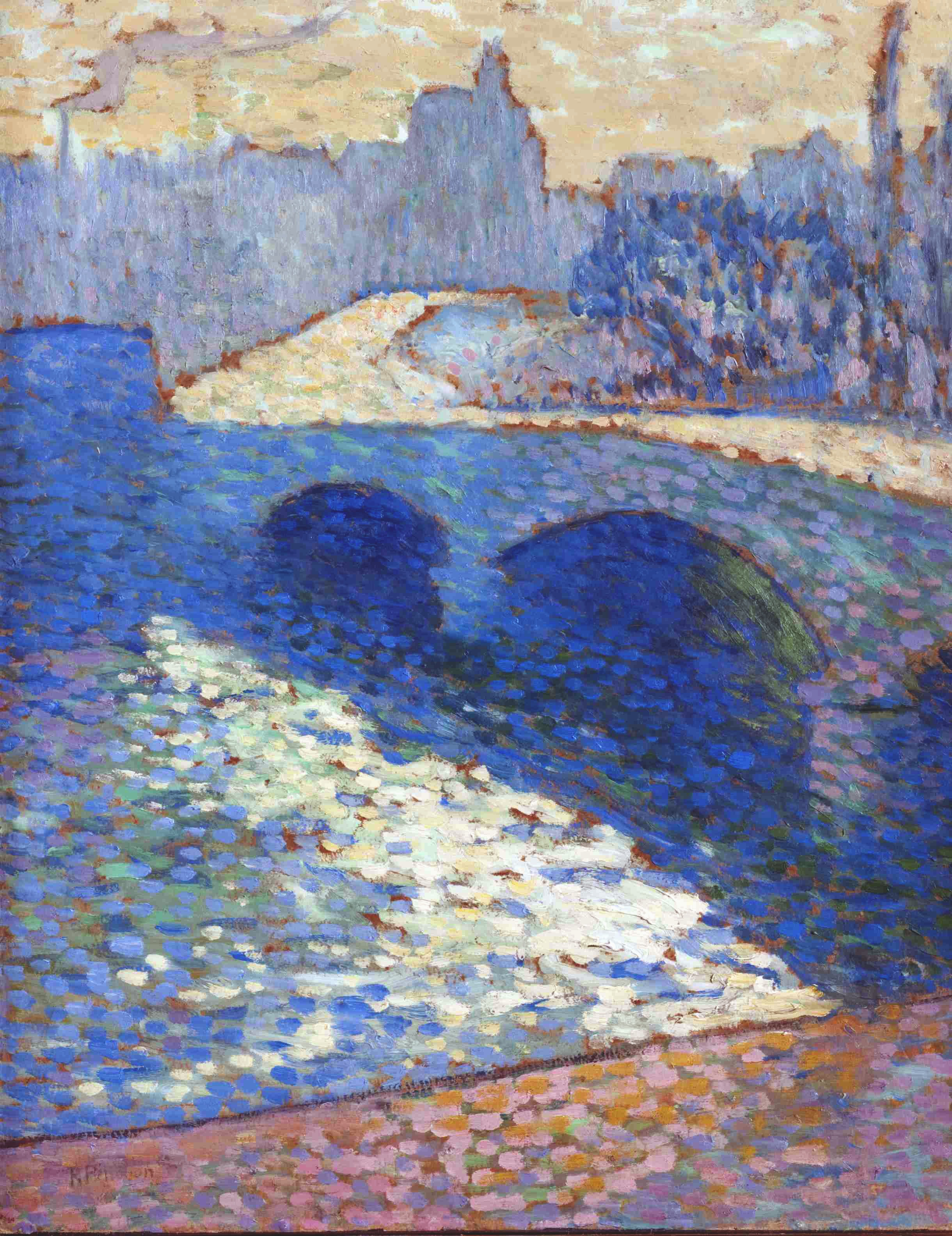
1905, La Seine à Rouen au crépuscule, oil on paperboard, 65 × 54 cm

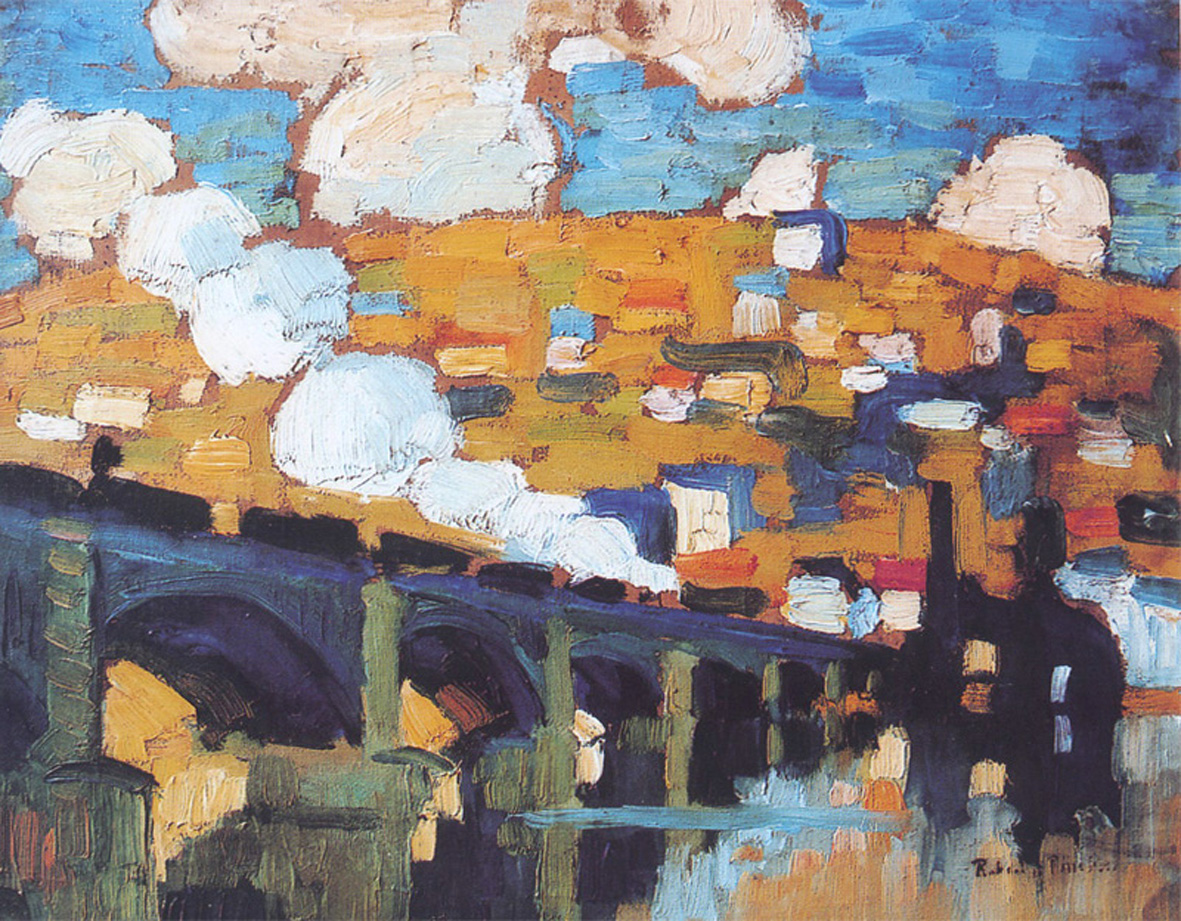
1905, Le Pont aux Anglais, Rouen, oil on canvas, 38 × 46 cm, private collection

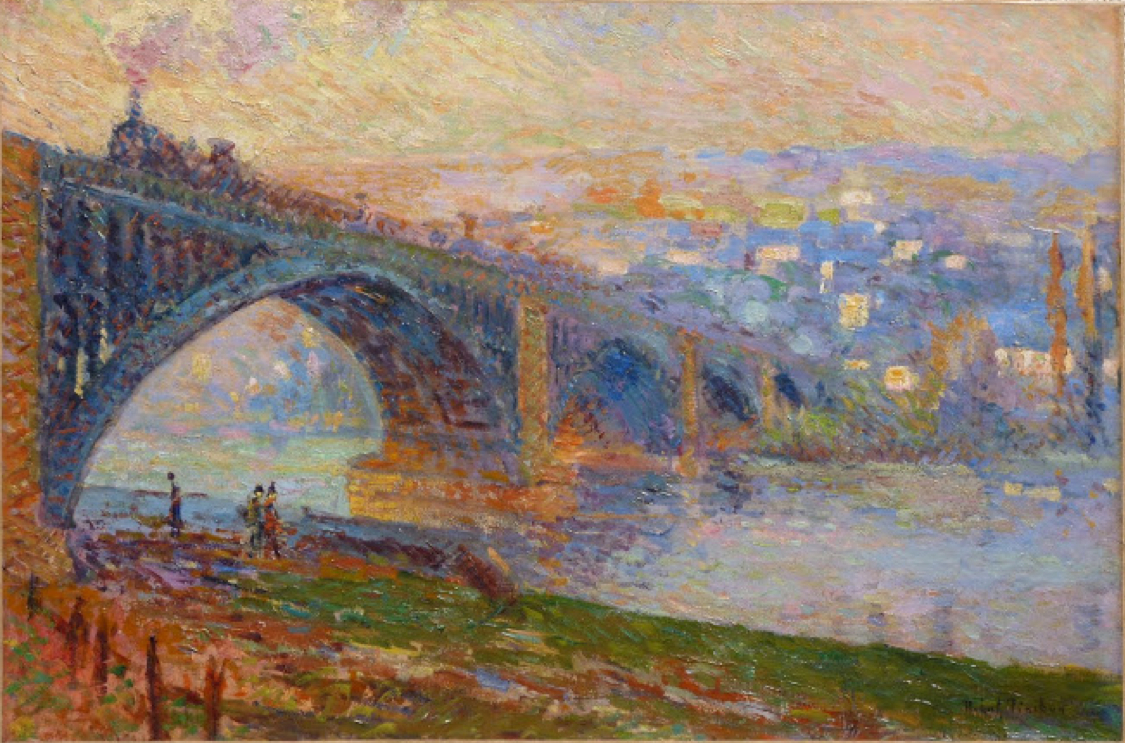
Rouen, Le Pont aux Anglais. This work is closely related to Le Pont aux Anglais, soleil couchant (Musée des Beaux-Arts de Rouen)
Flowers and gardens

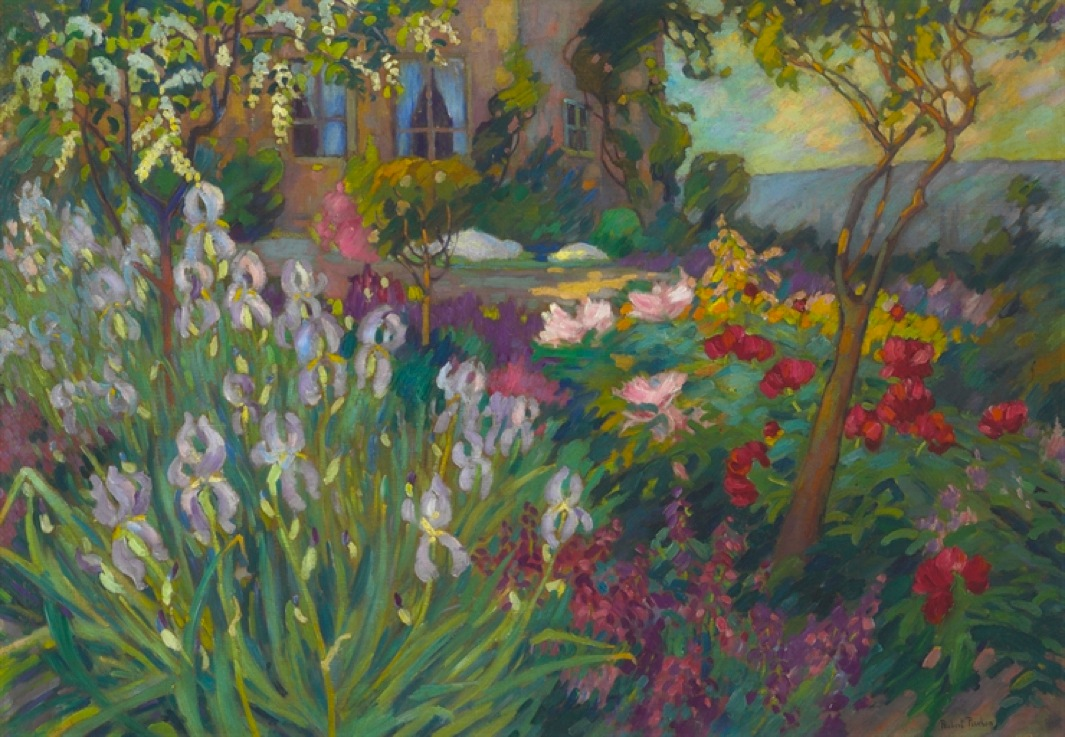
c.1920, Le jardin aux iris, oil on canvas, 80.9 × 116.2 cm

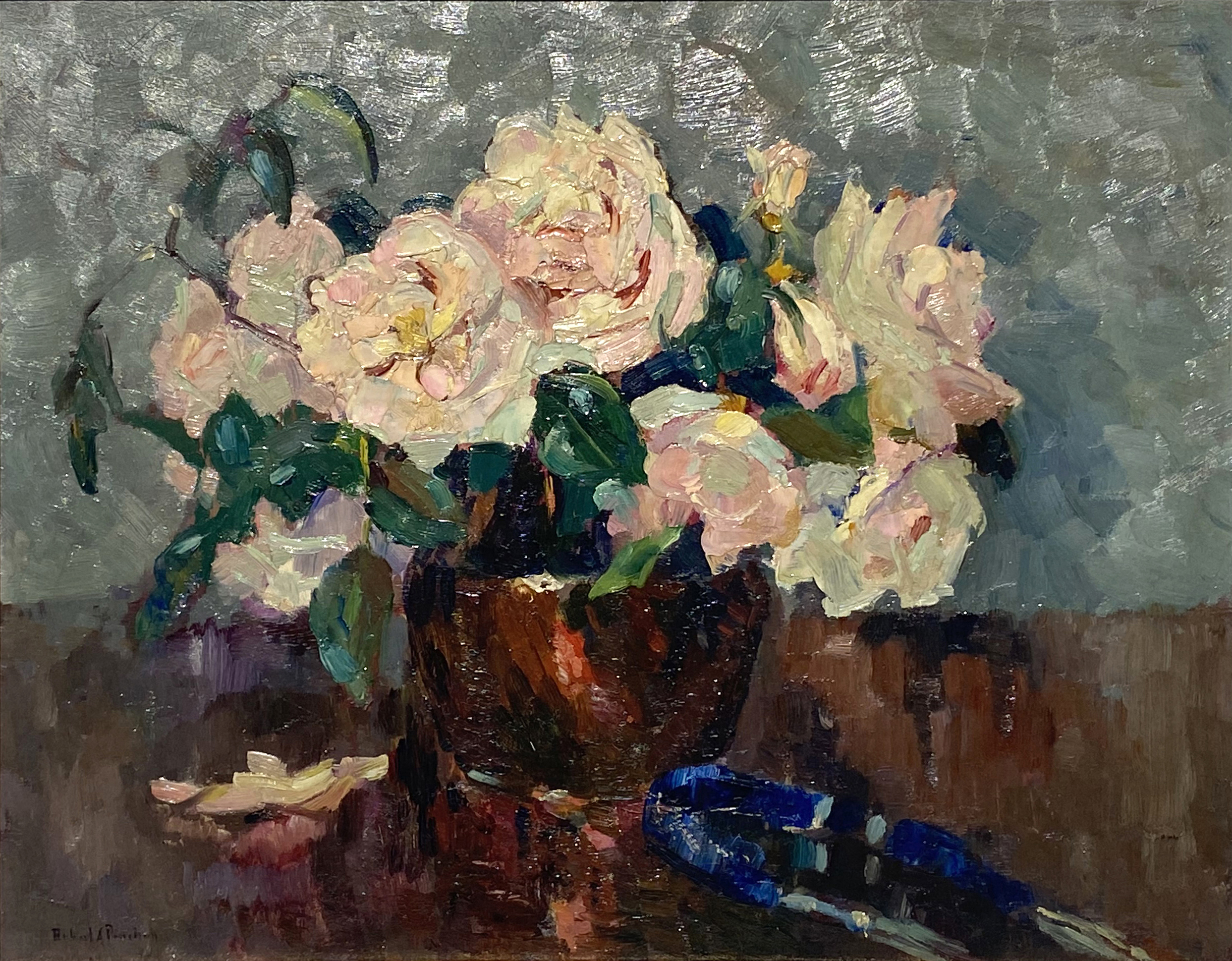
c. 1912, Fleurs dans un vase, oil on board, 43 x 56 cm, private collection

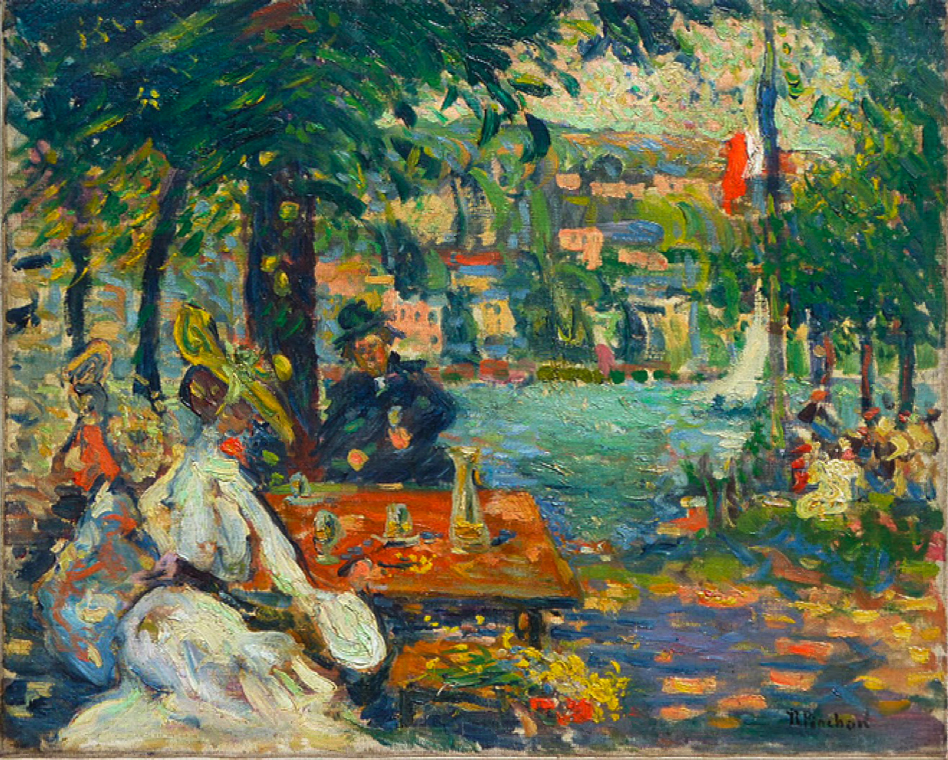
Un après-midi à l'Ile aux Cerises, Rouen, oil on canvas, 50 × 61.2 cm

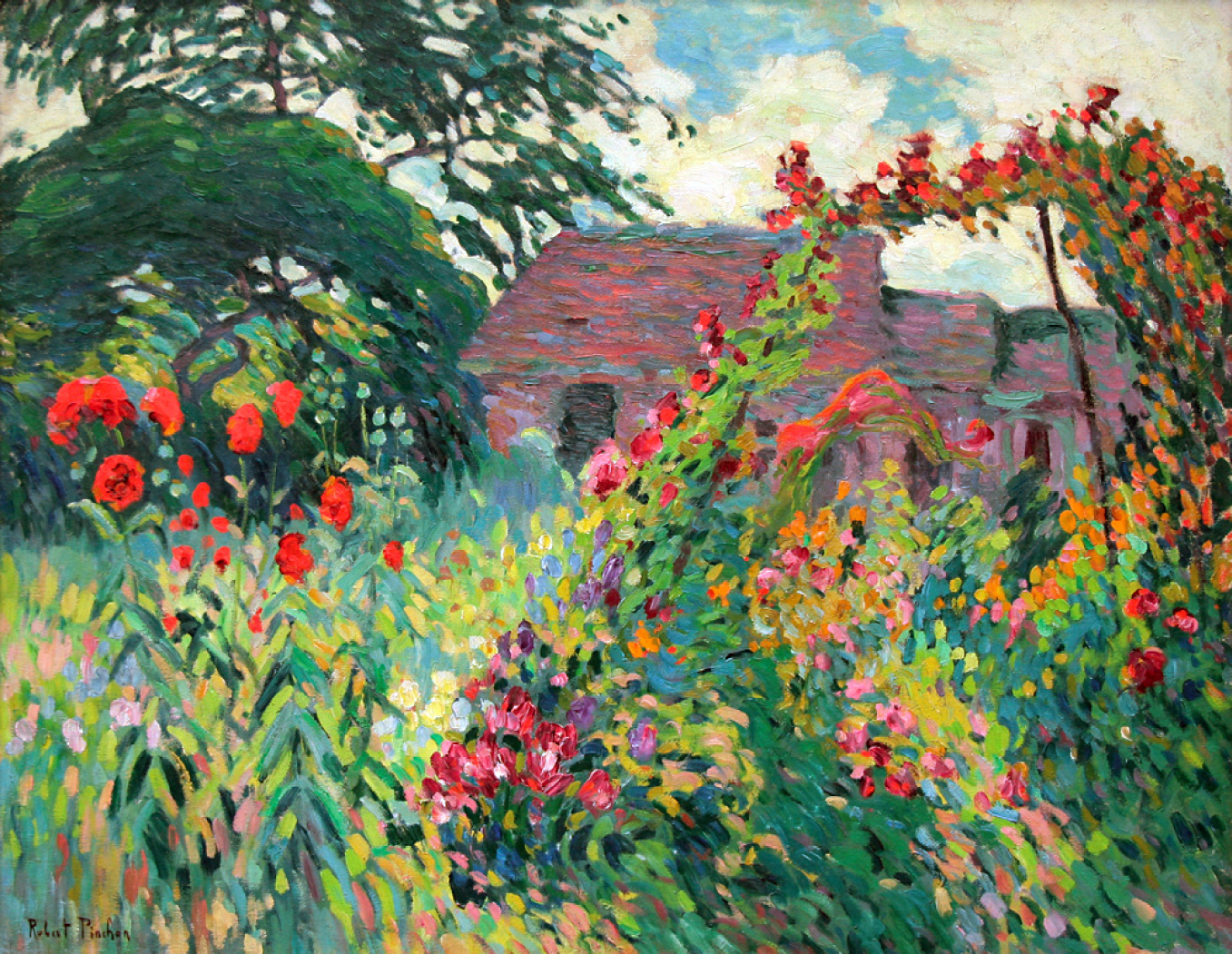
c.1906, Le jardin aux pavots, oil on canvas, 73 × 92 cm
Harbors and boats

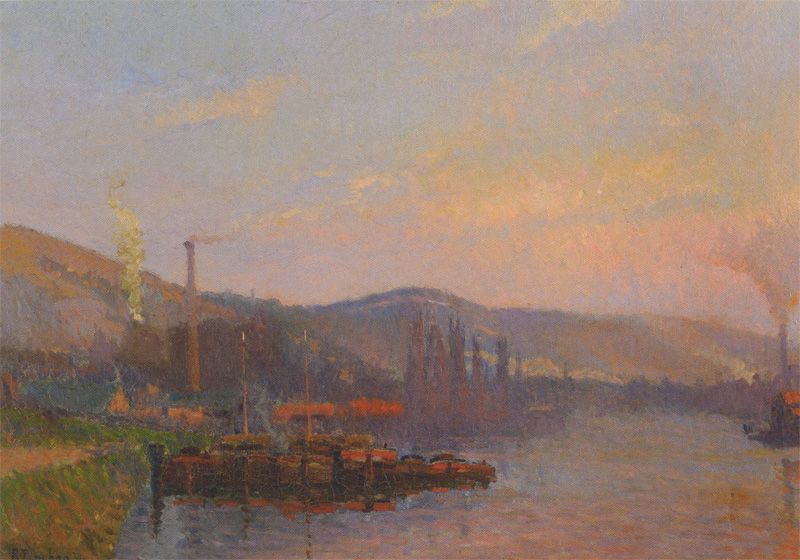
1904, Le Pré-aux-Loups, soleil couchant, oil on canvas, 50 × 73 cm, private collection

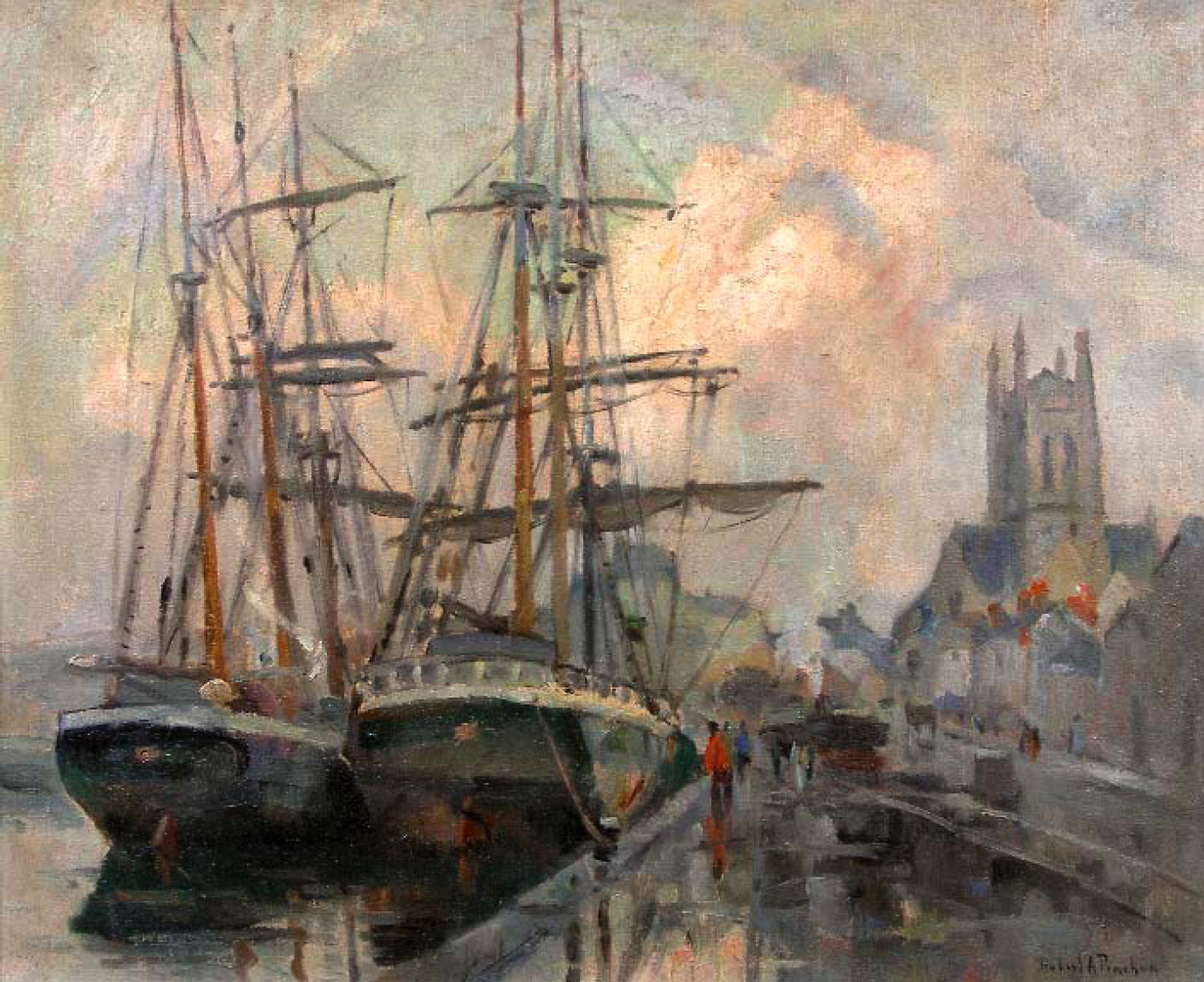
Le port de Fécamp, oil on canvas, 60 × 73 cm

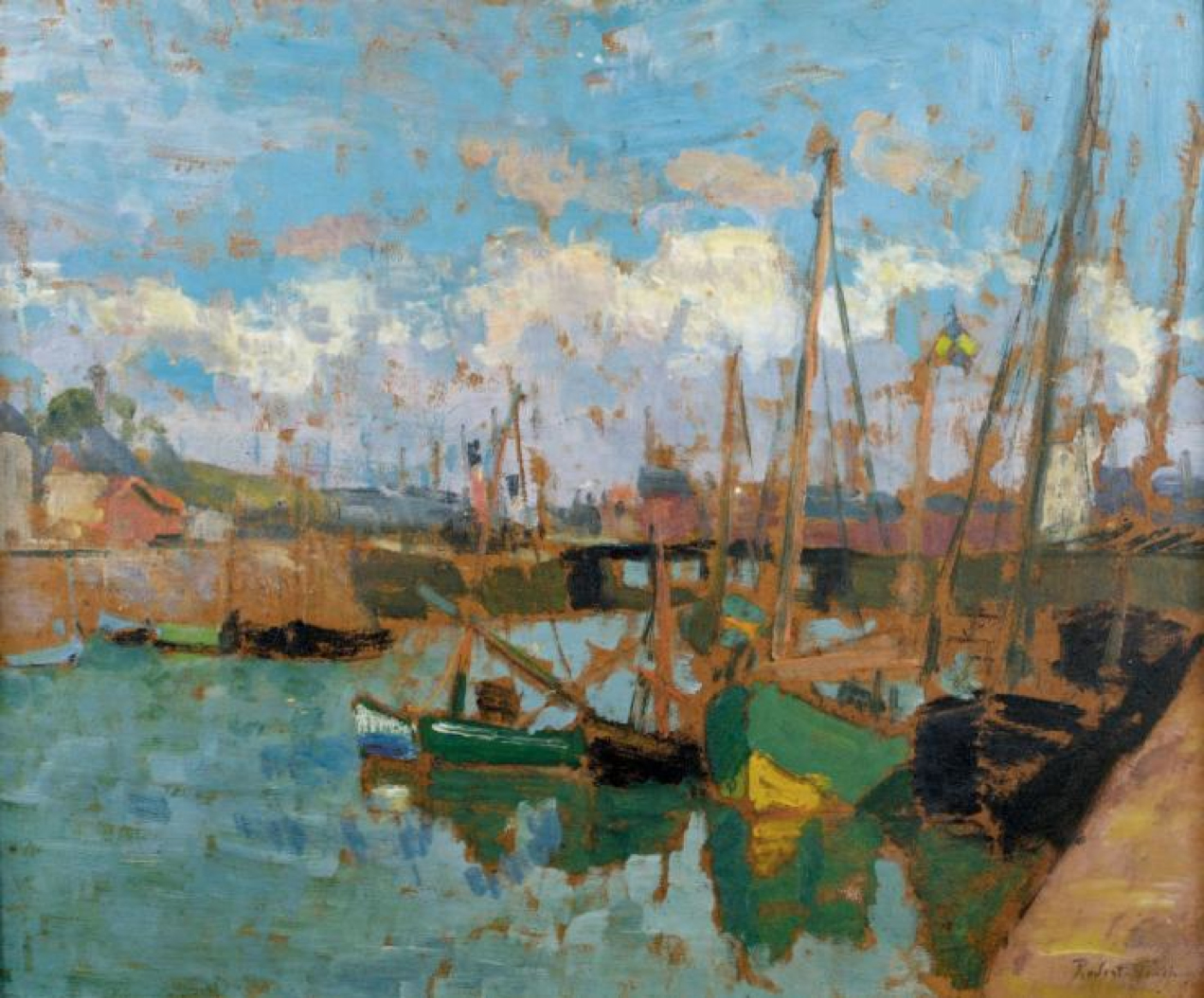
Bateaux au port, oil on carton, 46 × 55 cm

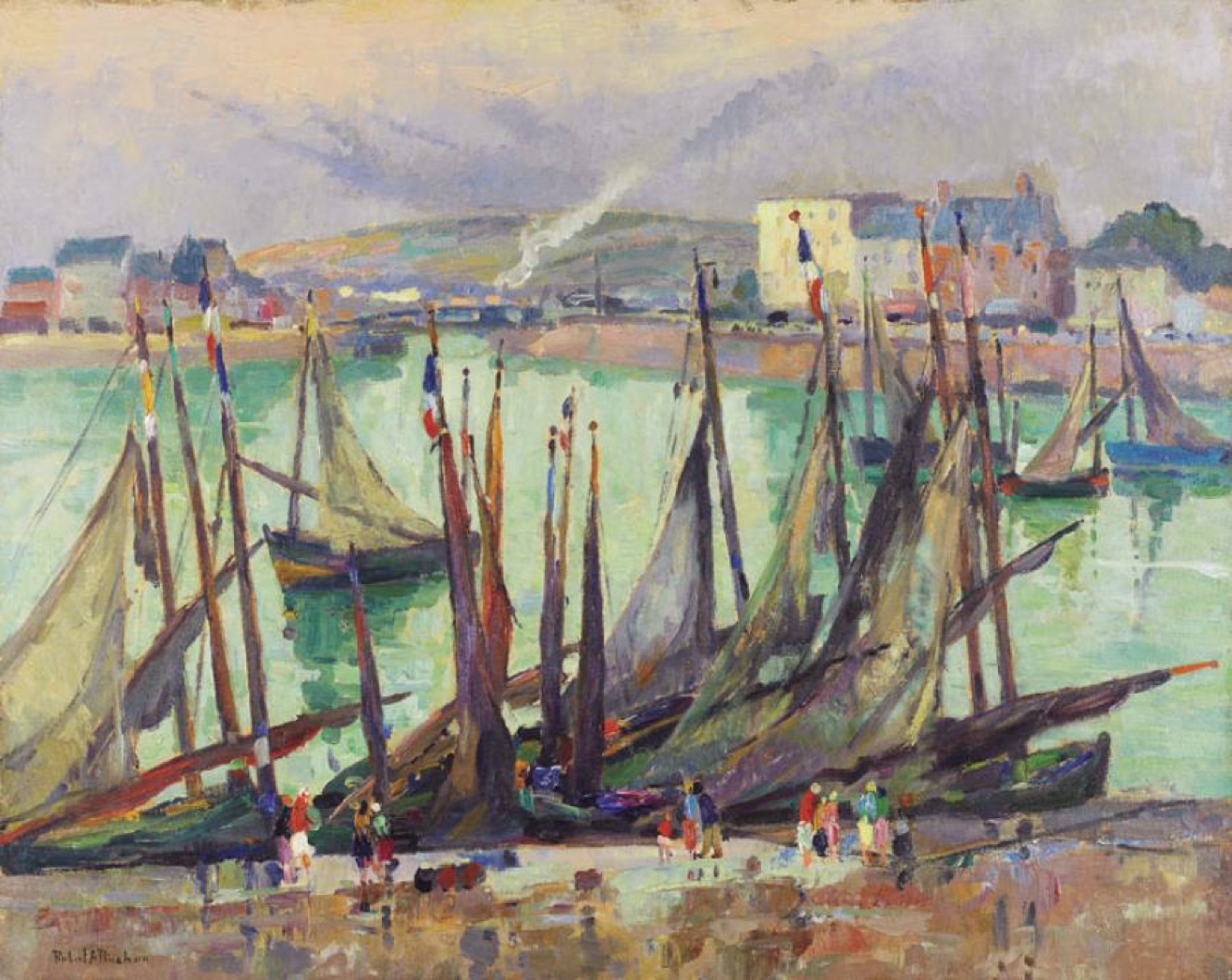
Vue du Tréport, oil on canvas, 65 × 81 cm
Landscapes and fields

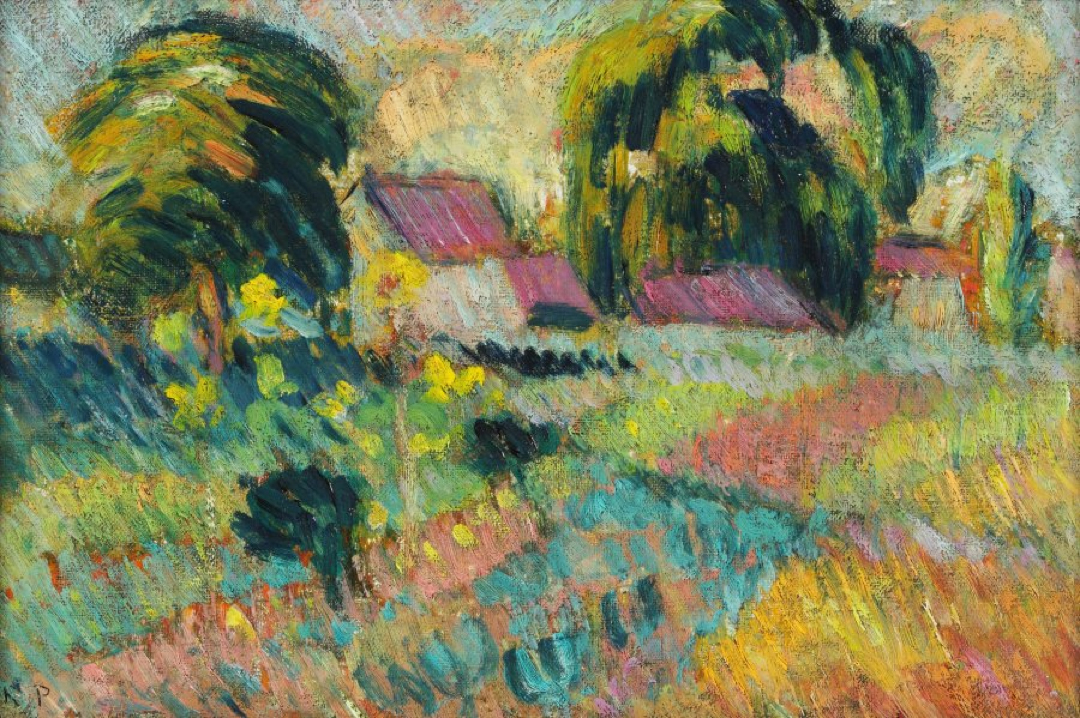
c. 1905, Hameau des environs de Rouen, oil on canvas, 22 × 33 cm

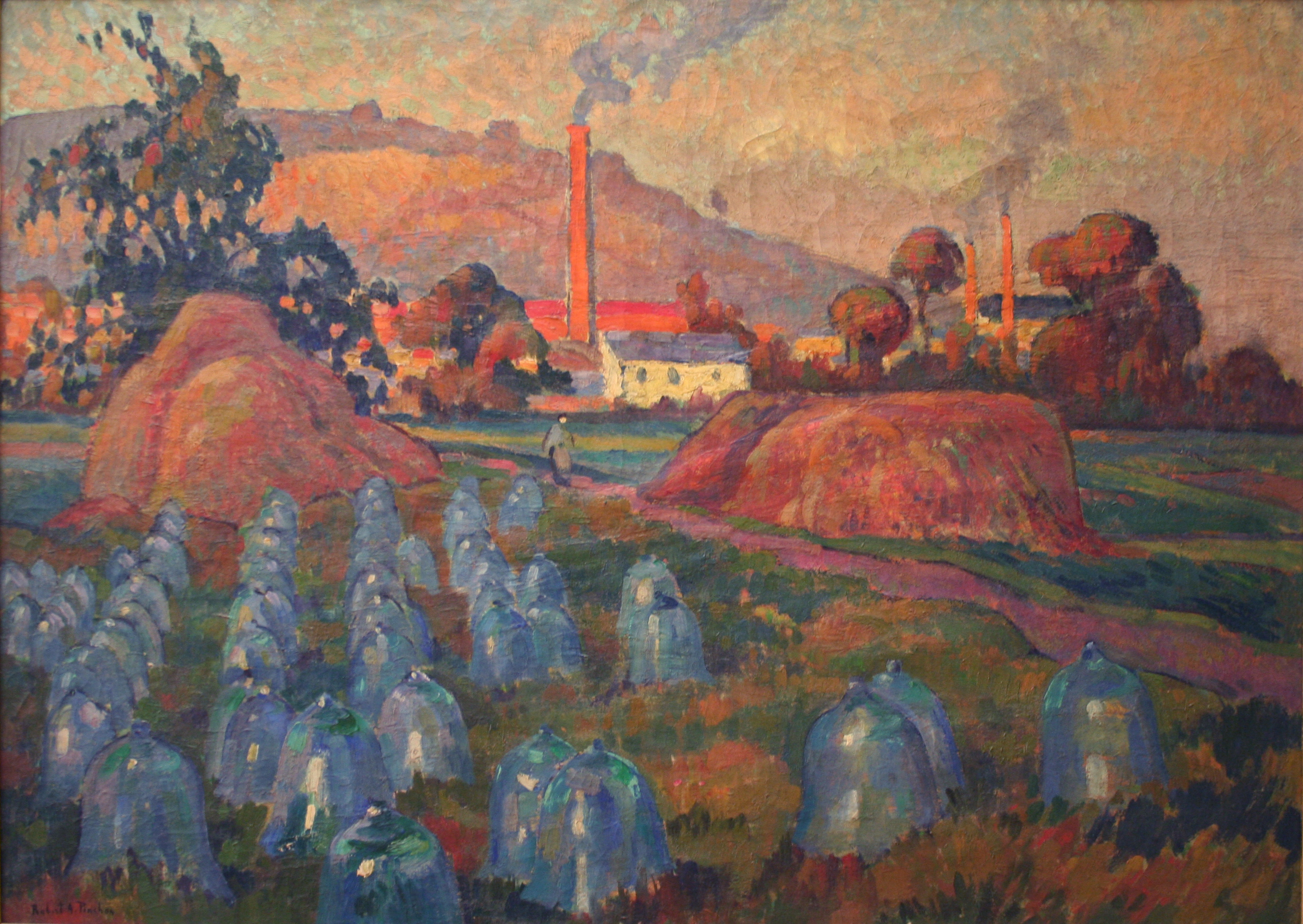
1921, Le Jardin maraicher, oil on canvas, 74 × 100 cm, Musée des Beaux-Arts de Rouen

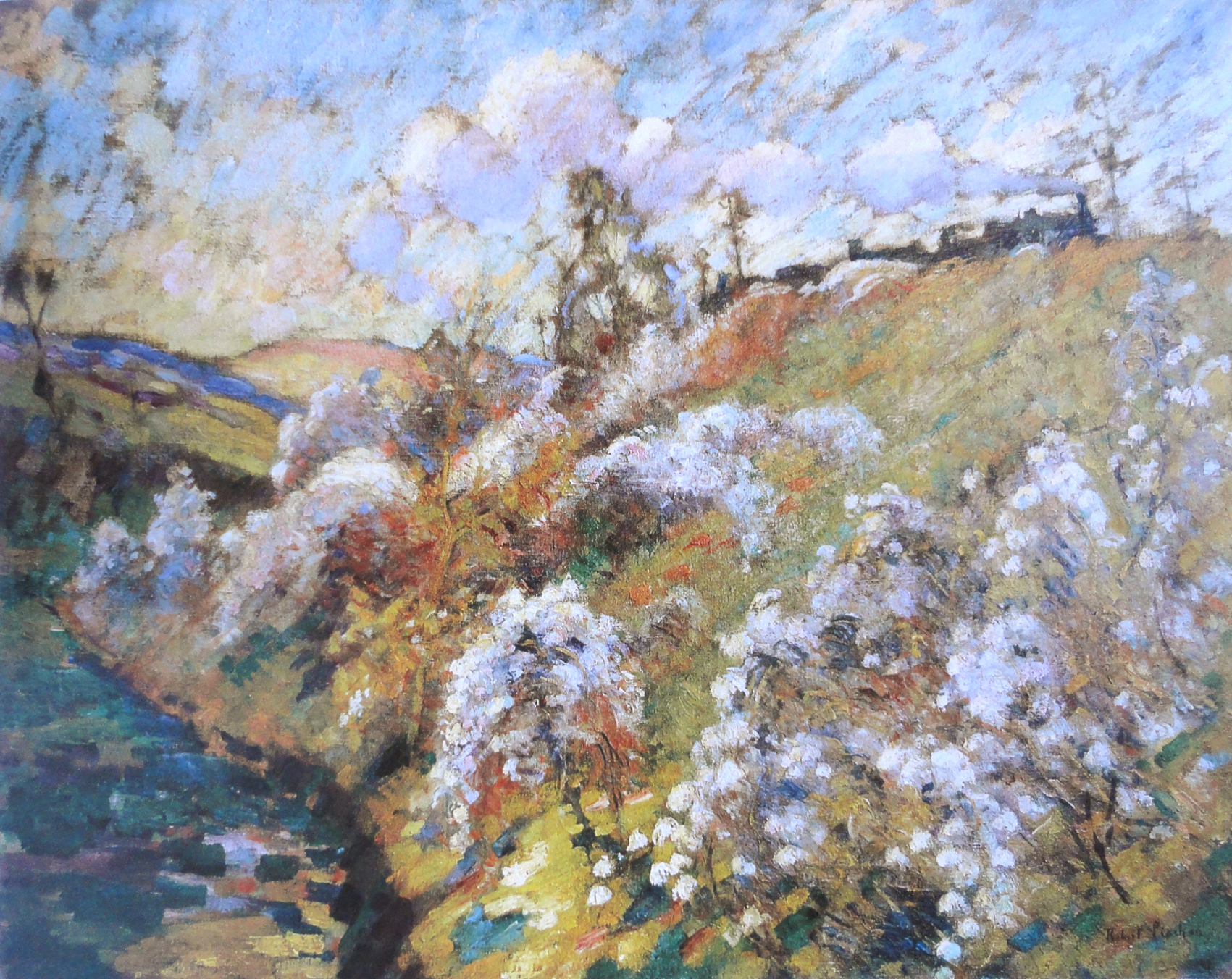
1912, Le Talus de chemin de fer, oil on canvas, 81 × 100 cm

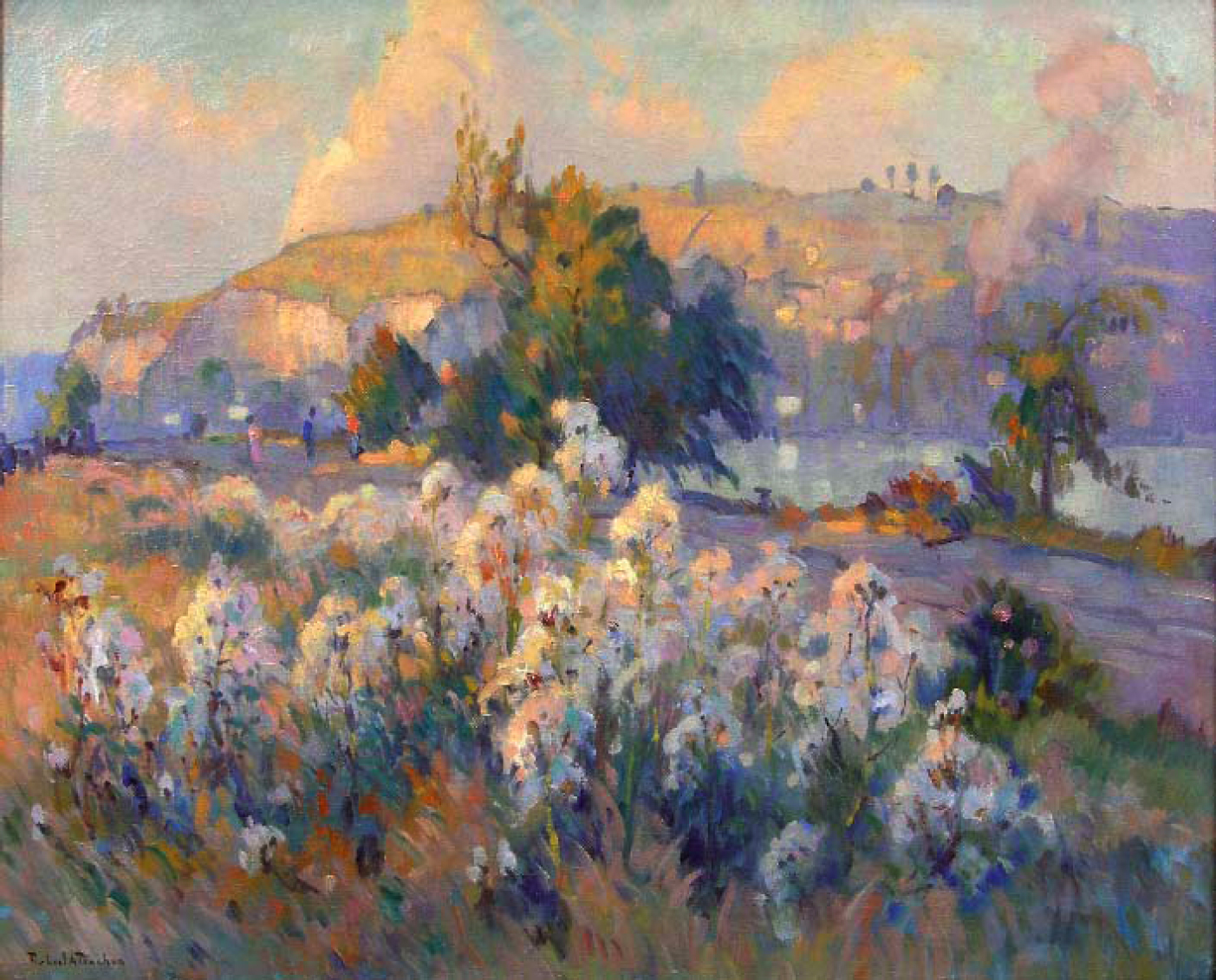
Les chardons en bord de Seine (Chardons en fleurs), oil on canvas, 65 × 81 cm
River scenes

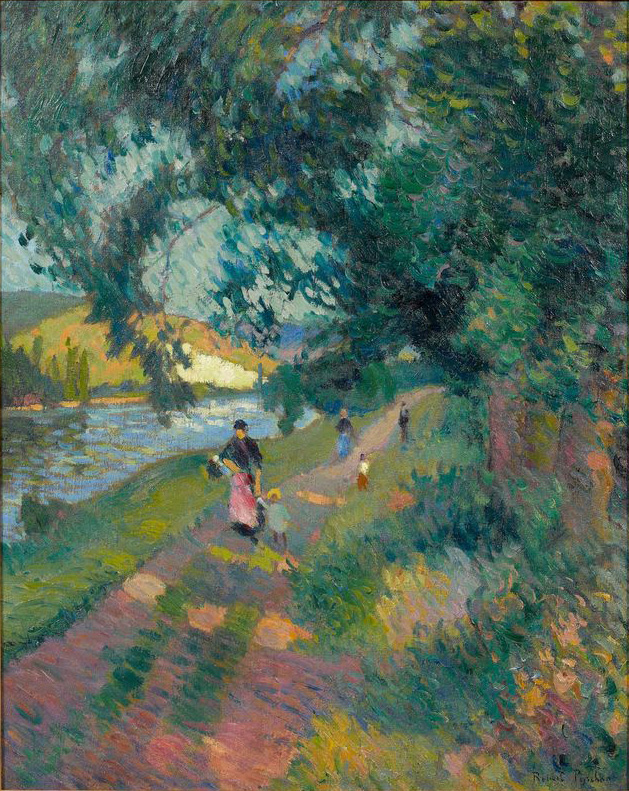
Promenade sur le chemin de Halage, oil on canvas, 81 × 65 cm

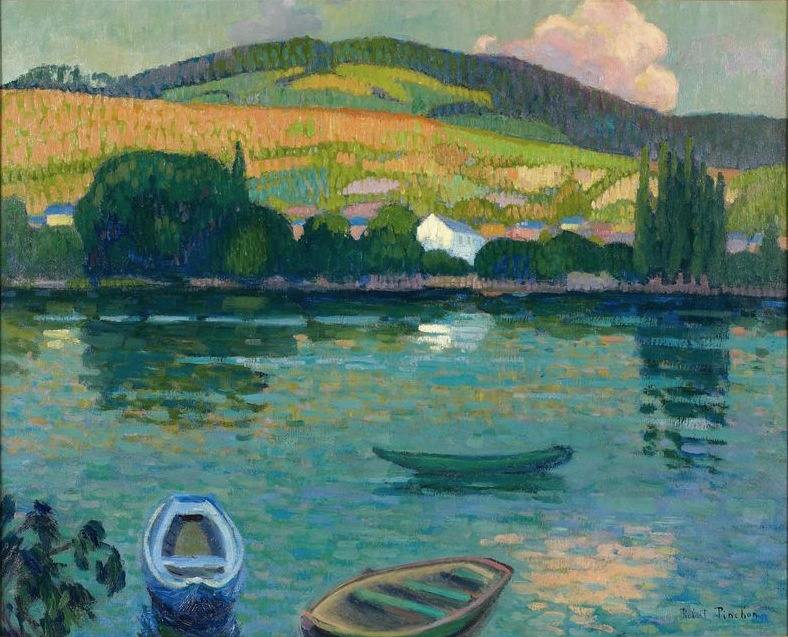
1909-10, Les coteaux de Belbeuf (Barques), oil on canvas, 65.5 × 81 cm

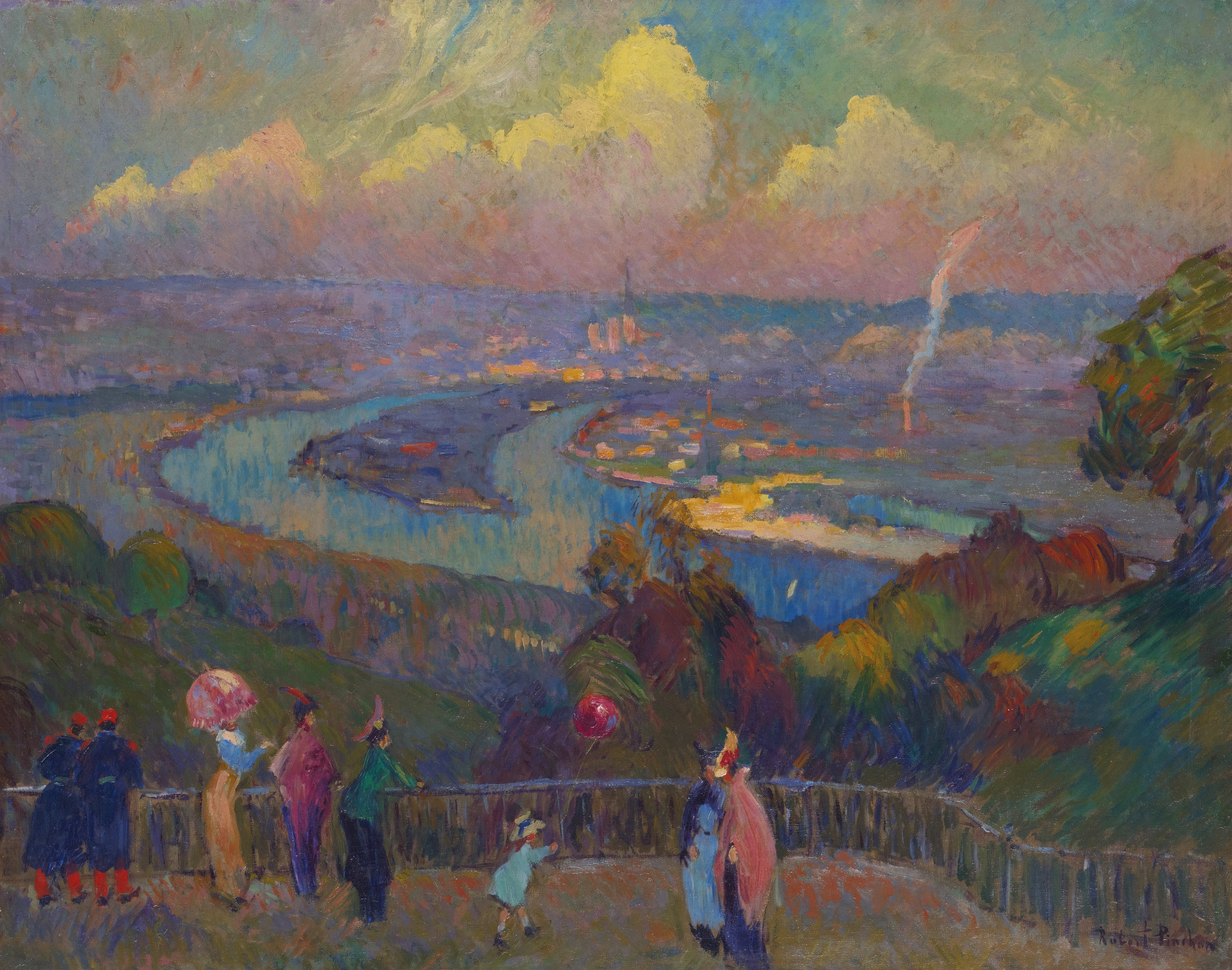
Rouen, La Seine, Vue depuis le Hauteurs de Caudbec, oil on canvas, 73.7 × 92.4 cm

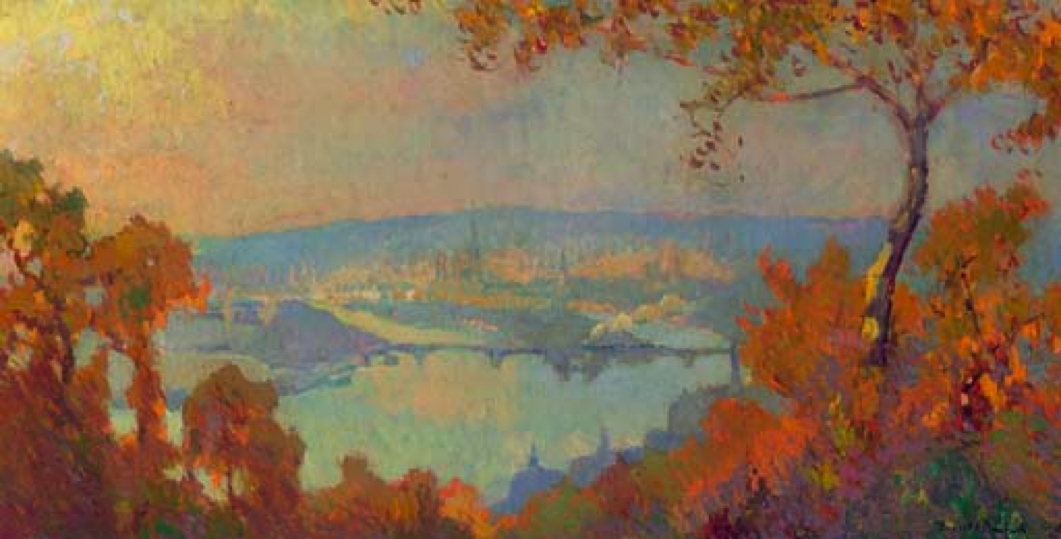
Rouen, vue de la Seine, oil on canvas, 48.9 × 94 cm
Winter scenes

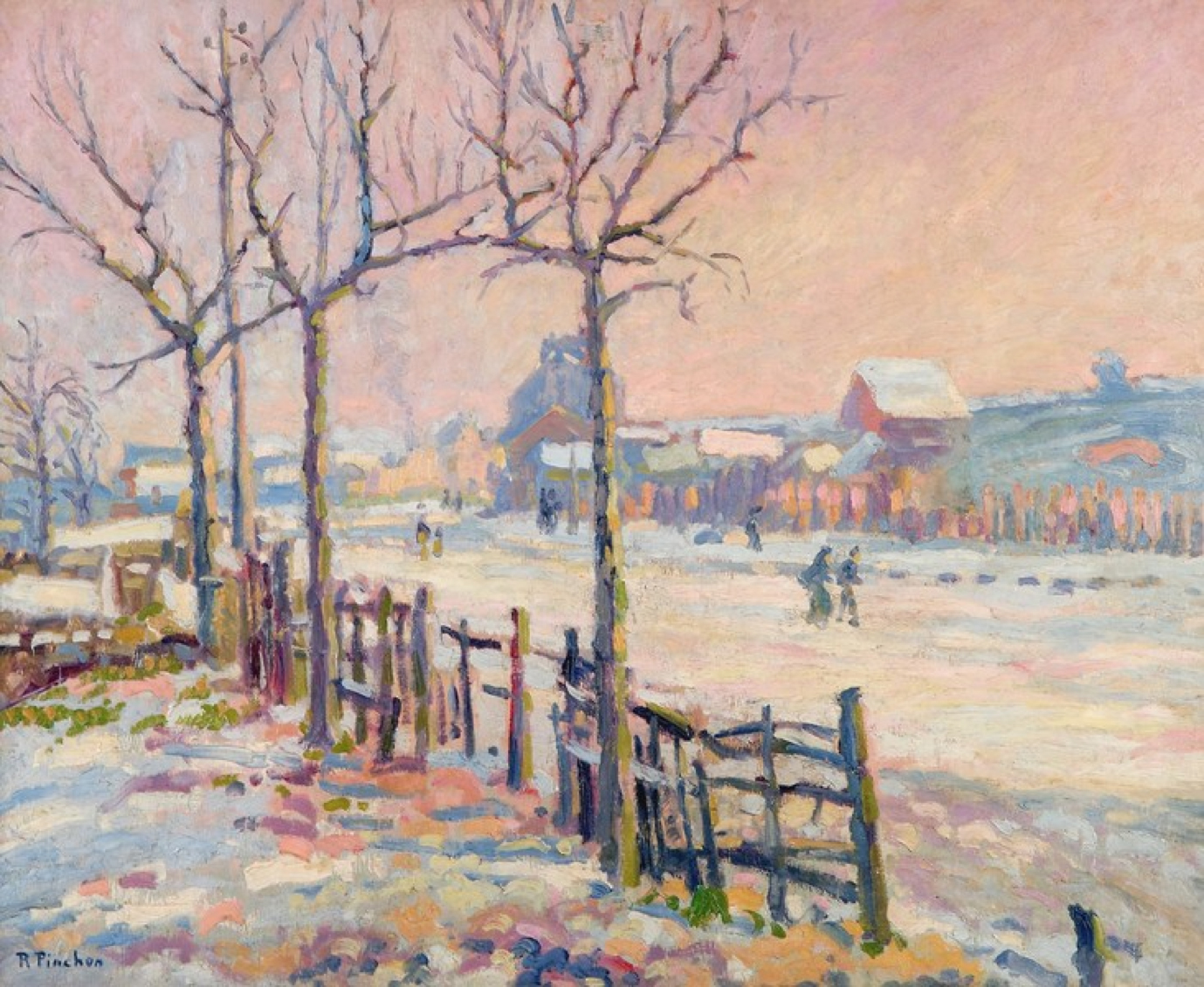
1905, Paysage d'hiver (Le chemin, neige), oil on canvas, 60 × 73 cm, private collection

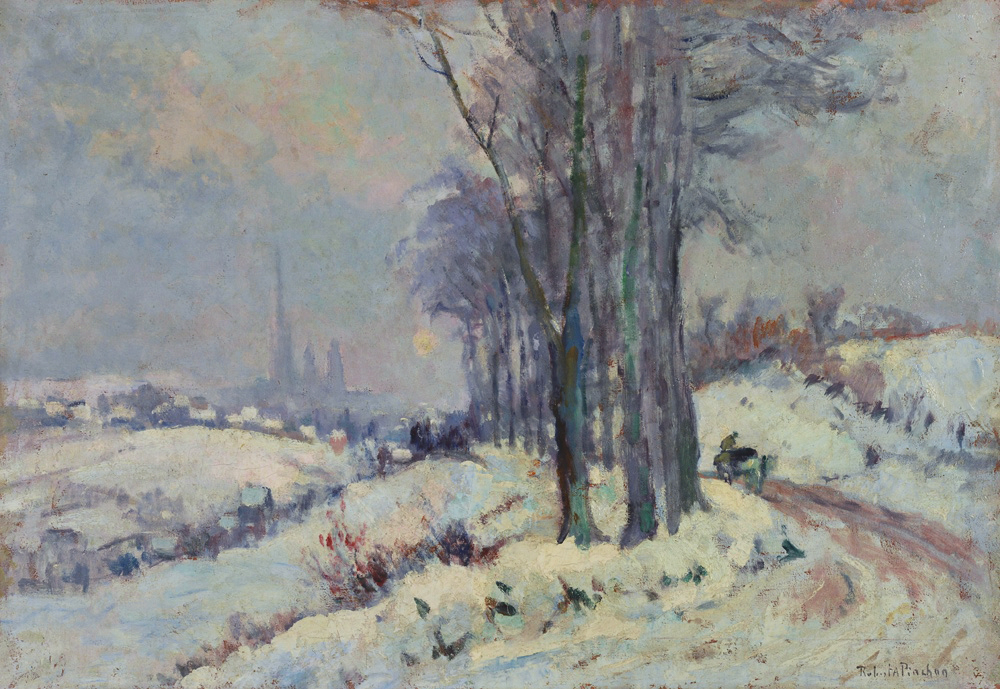
Environs de Rouen sous la neige, oil on canvas, 50 × 60 cm

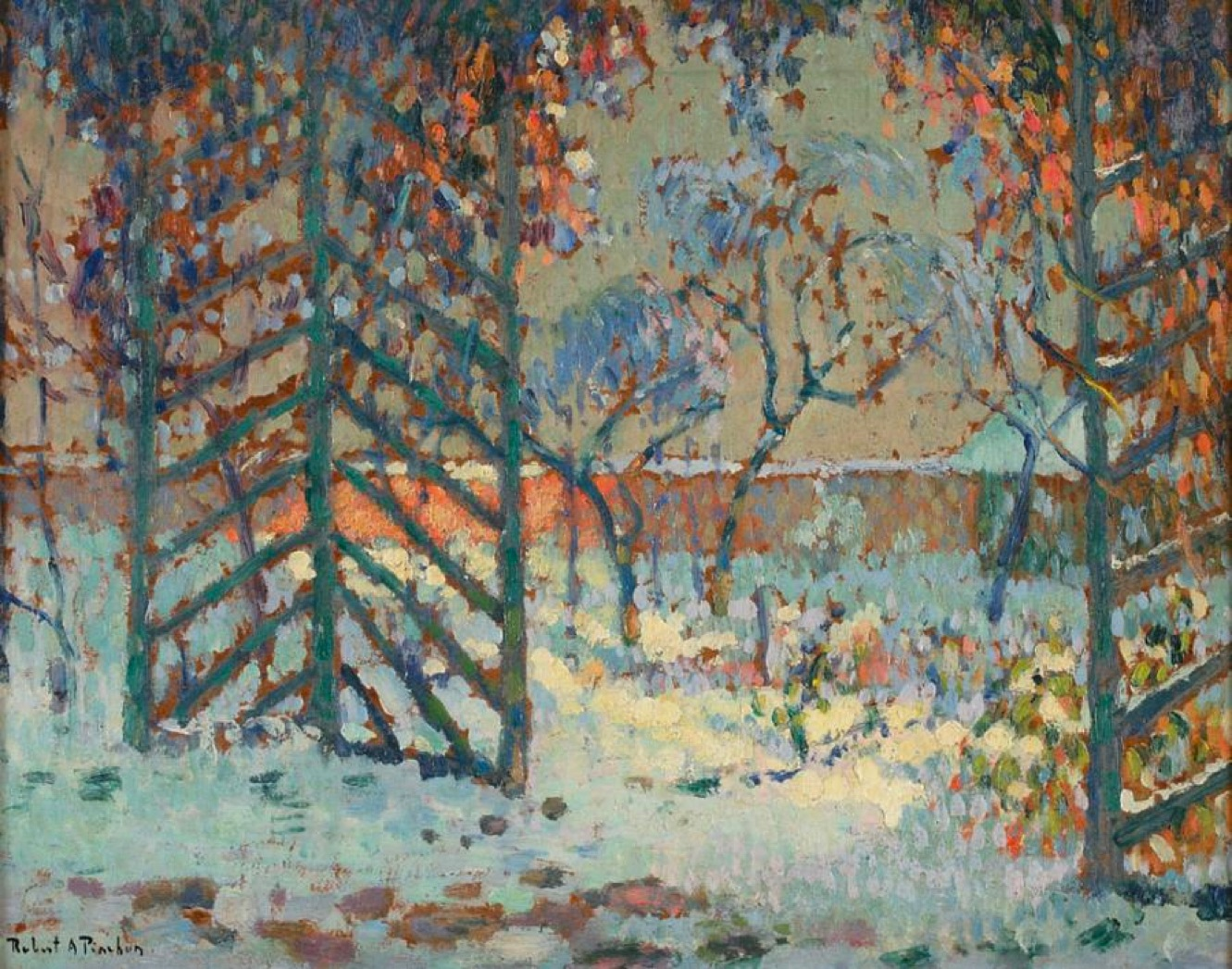
1916, La tonnelle sous la neige (The Pergola Under Snow), oil on canvas, 54 × 92 cm

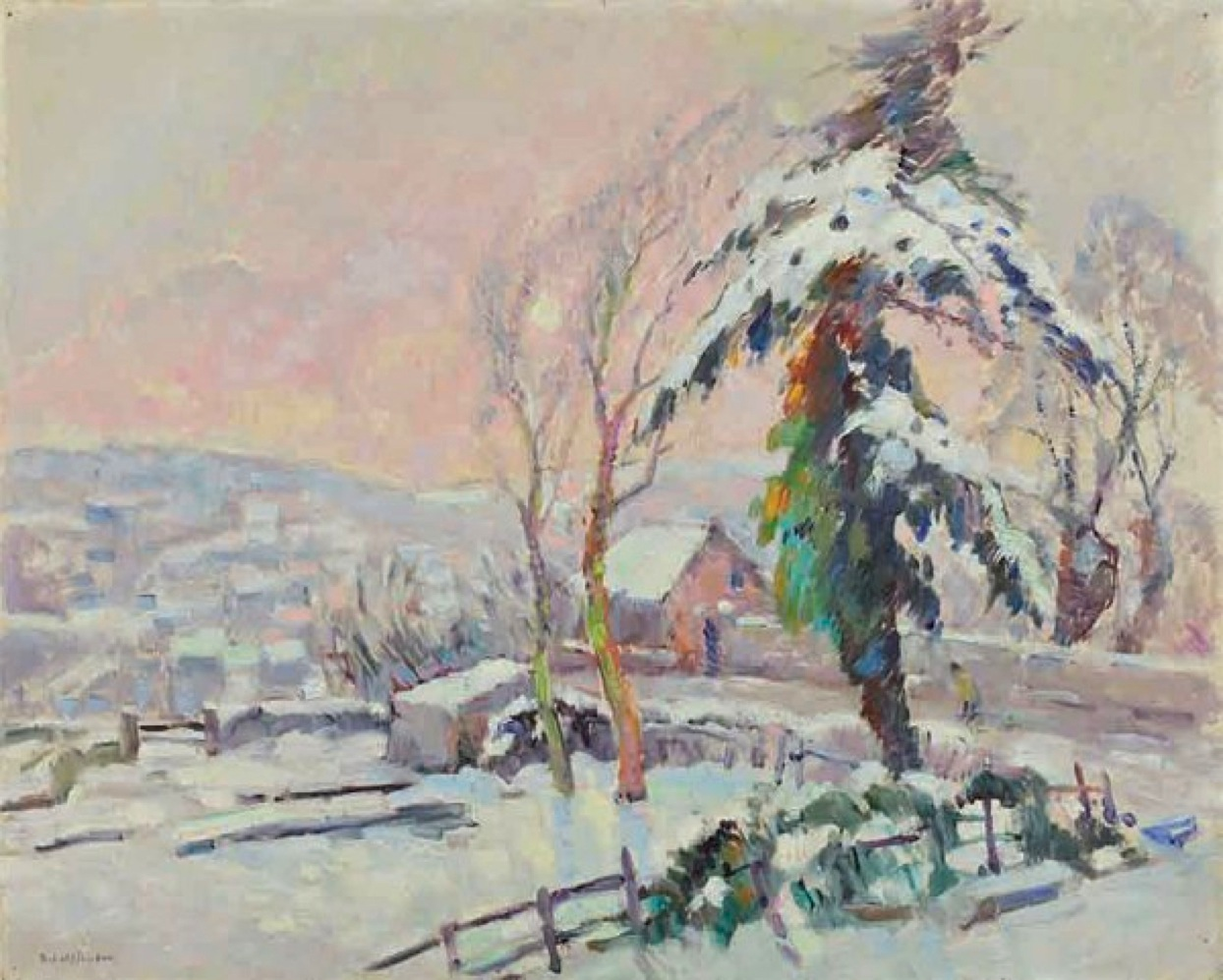
Village enneigé, oil on canvas, 73 × 92 cm

== Works in selected museums ==
- Le Pont aux anglais, soleil couchant, (1905) Musée des Beaux-Arts de Rouen
- Prairies inondées (Saint-Etienne-du-Rouvray, près de Rouen), (1905–06) Musée de Louviers, Eure
- Le coteau d'Amfreville, près Rouen (La carrière à mi-voie) (1908) Musée de Draguignan
- Effet de neige, (1909) Musée des Beaux-Arts de Rouen
- Péniches dans la brume, (1909) Musée des Beaux-Arts de Rouen
- Vue prise du mont Gargan, soleil couchant, (before 1909) Musée des Beaux-Arts de Rouen
- Le Jardin maraicher, (ca 1921) Musée des Beaux-Arts de Rouen
- Barque échouée, Saint Valéry en Caux (before 1927) Office national des Combustibles liquides, Paris
- Bord de Seine à Caumont (ca 1928–30) Musée Alfred Canel
- Le Port et le Pont transbordeur de Rouen, (1943) Musée des Beaux-Arts de Rouen
- Le Pourquoi-Pas du commandant Charcot dans le port de Rouen (1935) Musée des Beaux-Arts de Rouen

== Works in selected public and private collections ==
- La Lande à Petit-Couronne (1903)
- Les toits rouges (1903) Christie's New York, 2012
- La Seine à Croisset (1903)
- Triel-sur-Seine, en aval de Paris, le pont ferroviaire sur la Seine Vers (1904)
- La Seine à Rouen au crépuscule (1905)
- Le Pont Transbordeur à Rouen (1905), Salon d'Automne 1905, no. 1253
- Le Pont Boieldieu, à Rouen (1905), Salon d'Automne 1905, no. 1254
- Vieilles Cabanes dans l'Île Lacroix, a Rouen (1905), Salon d'Automne 1905, no. 1255
- Le Chemin, neige (1905)
- Coin de Seine à La Bouille or Restaurant champêtre de la Bouille (1906)
- La Seine vue de Belbeuf (1907) Tajan, Paris, 2007
- Le 14 Juillet, Place de la Basse Vieille Tour à Rouen (1908)
- Le Petit Train, côte Sainte-Catherine (1908-1909)
- Le Pont de chemin de fer près de Rouen (1910-1915) Christie's New York, 2008
- Le vallon du temps perdu (1910)
- Le Bassin aux nymphéas (ca 1910)
- Péniches sur la Seine (ca 1910)
- Le Toquesac Aout (1912)
- Le talus de chemin de fer (1912)
- Fleurs des champs (ca 1915) Christie's New York, 2008
- Pots de géraniums (ca 1915–1920)
- Le jardin aux iris (ca 1920) Christie's New York, 2008
- Les chardons en fleurs (1920–25)
- A l'île aux cerises, Christie's New York, 2008
- Rouen, vue de la Seine, Christie's New York, 2007
- Dieppe et son port
- Chalands à Dieppedalle

== Bibliography ==
- Almanach pour 1908, Edition du Groupe des XXX (trente), PARIS, ROUEN, décembre 1907
- Georges Dubosc, 1914, L'École de Rouen: ses peintres et ses ferronniers
- Exposition Robert A. Pinchon, éditeur Galerie A. M. Reitlinger, 1926, Paris
- Paulme, Henri, 1933, La Brillante carrière d'un peintre de l'Ecole moderne de Rouen : Réponse au discours de réception de Robert-A. Pinchon, Rouen, Impr. A. Lainé
- Maupassant, 1933, Les Contes normands, Illustrations de Robert-A. Pinchon; Introduction de Henri Defontaine
- Lucie Delarue-Mardrus, 1935, Rouen, éd. Henri Defontaine, Rouen, Illustrations de Robert Antoine Pinchon
- Chirol, Pierre, 1936, Cathédrales et Eglises Normandes: H. Defontaine, Illustrations de Robert Pinchon, Éditions et Impressions Paul Duval, Elbeuf-Paris
- Jean de la Varende, 1937, Les Châteaux de Normandie (Basse-Normandie) illustrated by Robert-A. Pinchon
- Rouen et l'Exode, 1941, R. A. Pinchon et al, Preface by Fernand Guey
- Defontaine, H., 1941, Rouen à travers les âges, 1941; Pierre Chirol et René Herval; illustrations de Robert A. Pinchon, Pierre Le Trividic et Michel Fréchon; Impr. Commerciale du Journal de Rouen, 20 mars 1941
- Robert A. Pinchon, Rétrospective, 1886-1943, Galerie Hervé, Paris, Du 23 mars au 30 avril 1971, Paris
- François Lespinasse, L'École de Rouen, Fernandez, Sotteville-lès-Rouen, 1980
- Caroline Laroche, 7 peintres de l'école de Rouen : Marcel Couchaux, Alfred Dunet, Charles Fréchon, Narcisse Guilbert, Pierre Le Trividic, Maurice Louvrier, Robert Pinchon, Alain Letailleur, Paris, 1990
- François Lespinasse, Robert Antoine Pinchon, 1886-1943, Rouen, 1990
- Alain Letailleur, Robert Antoine Pinchon, Connivences, Paris, 1990
- Robert Antoine Pinchon: 1886–1943, Bogomila Welsh-Ovcharov, 1990
- Les Contes, de Guy de Maupassant; ill. de Robert-A. Pinchon; introd. de Henri Defontaine, Luneray, Bertout, 1993, 76-Luneray, impr. Bertout
- François Lespinasse, L'École de Rouen, Lecerf, Rouen, 1995
- L'École de Rouen de l'impressionnisme à Marcel Duchamp, 1878-1914, Musée des Beaux-Arts de Rouen, 1996
- Robert Antoine Pinchon, Texte imprimé: 1886-1943: exposition, Musée municipal de Louviers, 14 mars-11 mai 1998; texte de François Lespinasse, Musée de Louviers, 1997, Impr. Fromentin
- Guy Pessiot, 2004, Histoire de Rouen: 1900-1939 en 800 photographie
- François Lespinasse, Journal de l'École de Rouen 1877-1945, 2006
- François Lespinasse, Robert Antoine Pinchon, Ass. Les amis de l'École de Rouen, 2007
