= Louis Legendre (historian) =

French historian (1655–1733)

Louis Legendre (French pronunciation: [lwi ləʒɑ̃dʁ]; 1655–1733), was a French historian.

Born at Rouen (Normandy) to poor parents, Legendre owed the benefit of an education to François de Harlay de Champvallon, the archbishop of his native city, whom he followed to Paris, where he received a canonical at Notre Dame. He then went on to become abbot of Clairfontaine.

Legendre's style has been described as elegant, correct, and his criticism judicious and impartial. The facts he recounts are always backed up by convincing evidence. While not a first rank historian, Legendre nonetheless offers information of interest.

Legendre was the first benefactor of the Académie des Sciences, Belles-Lettres et Arts de Rouen. He also founded the competitive examination prize for the Paris colleges.

== Sources ==
- Henry, Auguste Charles (1875). Histoire de l'éloquence: avec des jugements critiques sur les plus célèbres orateurs, et des extraits nombreux (in French). Vol. 4 (3 ed.). Paris: Adrien Le Clere. p. 287.
- Legendre, Louis (1865). Mémoires de l'abbé Le Gendre: chanoine de Notre-Dame, secrétaire de M. de Harlay, archevêque de Paris abbé de Clairfontaine (in French). Paris: Charpentier.
- Quérard, Joseph-Marie (1835). Dictionnaire bibliographique des savants (in French). Vol. 7. Paris: Didot frères. pp. 93–7.
