= Académie des sciences, belles-lettres et arts de Rouen =

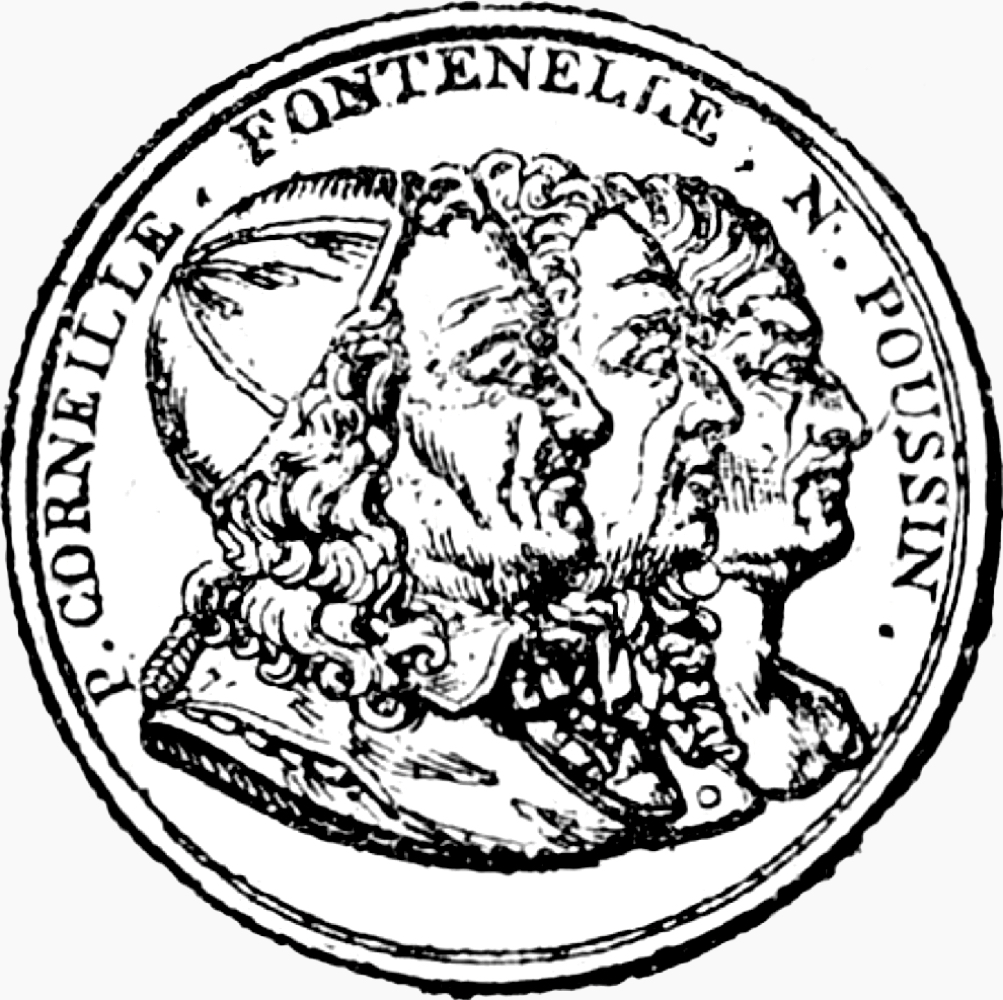
The Seal of the Académie des Sciences, Belles-Lettres et Arts de Rouen.

The Académie des Sciences, Belles-Lettres et Arts de Rouen is a learned society created by letters patent of King Louis XV on 17 June 1744.

The Academy of Rouen got its early start with a few friends with a common appreciation for botany who were in the habit of gathering in a small garden of the Bouvreuil suburb of Rouen, under the auspices of Fontenelle and Le Cornier de Cideville. The formal inception of the Academy of Rouen arose out of the officializing of those informal meetings into a learned society. The articles of the newly formed Academy were renewed and confirmed in Parliament on 10 February 1757. The first director was Tiphaigne La Roche, and its first benefactor was the abbé Legendre.

As with all French academies, abolished by the Revolution, the Académie de Rouen underwent a hiatus in 1793. Then the prefect of Seine-Inférieure department, Count Beugnot and the mayor of Rouen, Pierre Nicolas de Fontenay [fr], rechartered it in 1803. The academy recovered its archives and records on 29 June 1803, but not its library or its garden. On 1 June 1804, new letters of patent approved its new charter, which was later confirmed on 10 June 1828.

A decree dated 12 April 1852 has granted the Académie des sciences, belles-lettres et arts de Rouen public utility status.

In the absence of a university, the Académie has played, until 1965, a key role in the development of the movement of ideas in Rouen.

Its headquarters are now located at the Hôtel des sociétés savantes de Rouen.

== Academy members ==
=== Current members ===
Jean Malaurie - Louis Thiry

=== Former members ===
Jean-Baptiste de Milcent – Daniel-François-Esprit Auber - François Adrien Boieldieu - Louis François de La Bourdonnaye - Louis-Henri Brévière - Jean-Antoine Chaptal - Jean Siméon Chardin - Cochin - Prosper Jolyot de Crébillon - Georges Cuvier - Jean Delacour - Jacques Delille - Joseph-Nicolas Delisle - Léopold Delisle - Jean-Baptiste Descamps - Dufriche Desgenettes - Pinot Duclos - Jean-Jacques Duval d'Eprémesnil - Pierre Flourens - Bernard Le Bouyer de Fontenelle - Édouard Frère - Ulric Guttinguer - Gabriel Hanotaux - La Harpe - Jean-Pierre Houël - Victor Hugo - Bernard Lefebvre - Noël Le Mire - Pierre Lemonnier - Auguste Le Prévost - Jean-Jacques Lequeu - Emmanuel Liais - Marmontel - Jean-Michel Moreau - Necker - Jean Antoine Nollet - Jean-Frédéric Oberlin - Parmentier - Théophile-Jules Pelouze - Pigalle - Robert Antoine Pinchon - Jean Restout the Elder - Jean Restout the Younger - Jean-Bernard Restout - Tiphaigne La Roche - Jean-Marie Roland - Pilâtre de Rozier - Antoine Léonard Thomas - Louis-Nicolas Vauquelin - Volta - Jean-Jacques d'Ortous de Mairan

== Bibliography ==
- Gosseaume, Pierre-Laurent-Guillaume (1814–1821). Précis analytique des travaux de l’Académie des sciences, belles-lettres et arts de Rouen depuis sa fondation en 1744 jusqu’à l’époque de sa restauration, le 29 juin 1803, précédé de l’histoire de l’Académie; Résumé analytique des travaux; 1881-2. Rouen: Pierre Périaux.
- Gosseaume, Pierre-Laurent-Guillaume (1814–1821). Histoire de l'académie royale des sciences, belles-lettres et arts de Rouen. Rouen: Pierre Périaux.
- Héron, Alexandre (1903). Liste générale des membres de l'Académie des sciences, belles-lettres et arts de Rouen de 1744-1745 à 1900-1901. Rouen: Gy.
- Tradition et modernité. 250^{e} anniversaire de l'Académie des Sciences. Rouen: Belles-Lettres et Arts de Rouen. 1994.
- Bergot, François (2009). Trésors de l'Académie des Sciences, Belles-Lettres et Arts de Rouen. Point de vues.
