= Galeries Dalmau =

Spanish art gallery (1906–1930)

Jean Metzinger, 1910–11, Deux Nus (Two Nudes, Two Women), oil on canvas, 92 × 66 cm, Gothenburg Museum of Art, Sweden. Exhibited at the first Cubist manifestation, Room 41 of the 1911 Salon des Indépendants, Paris. Exposició d'Art Cubista, Galeries Dalmau, Barcelona, 1912

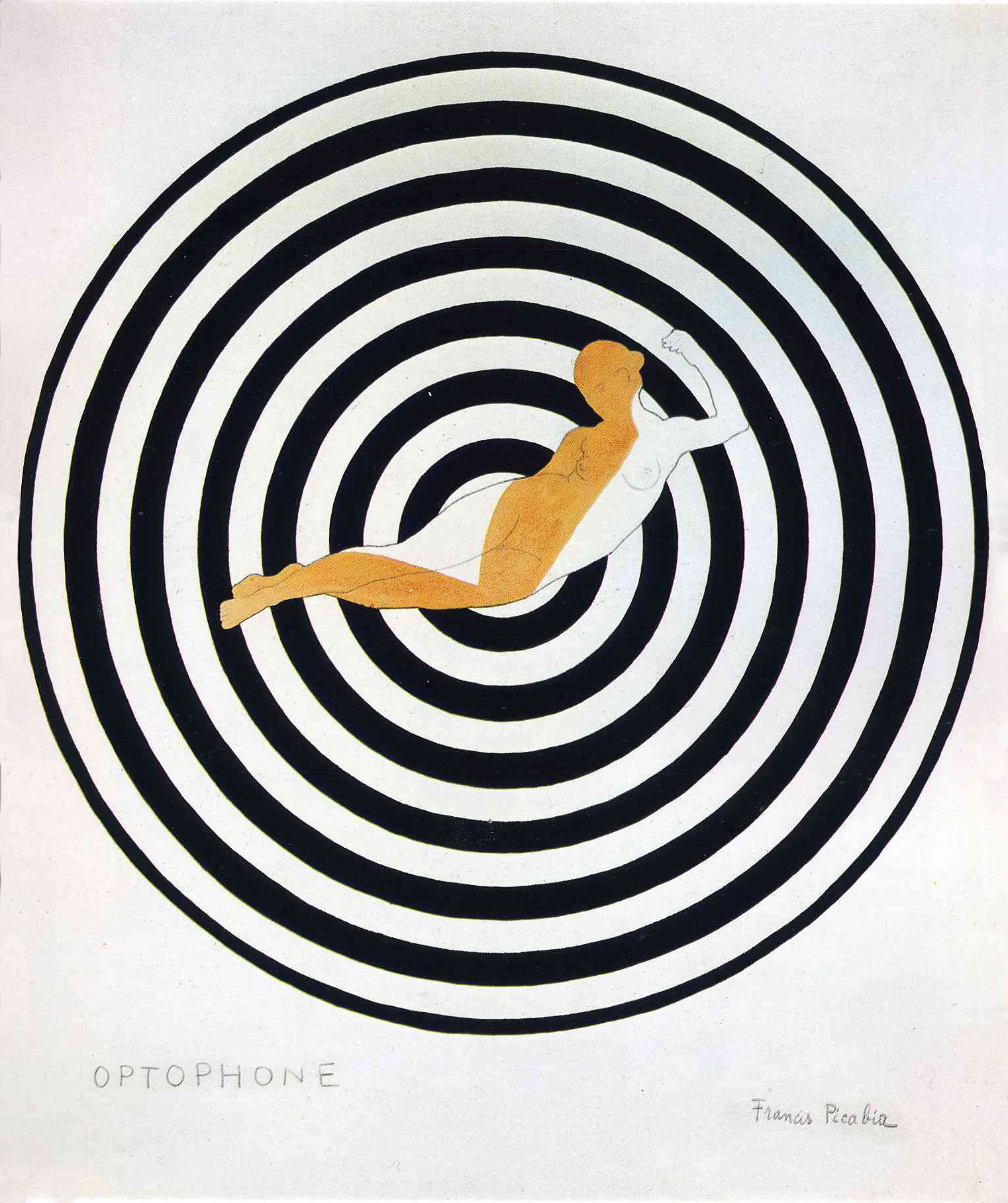
Francis Picabia, c. 1921–22, Optophone I, encre, aquarelle et mine de plomb sur papier, 72 × 60 cm. Reproduced in Galeries Dalmau, Picabia, exhibition catalogue, Barcelona, November 18 – December 8, 1922

Galeries Dalmau was an art gallery in Barcelona, Catalonia, Spain, from 1906 to 1930 (also known as Sala Dalmau, Les Galeries Dalmau, Galería Dalmau, and Galeries J. Dalmau). The gallery was founded and managed by the Symbolist painter and restorer Josep Dalmau i Rafel. The aim was to promote, import and export avant-garde artistic talent. Dalmau is credited for having launched avant-garde art in Spain.

In 1912, Galeries Dalmau presented the first declared group exhibition of Cubism worldwide, with a controversial showing by Jean Metzinger, Albert Gleizes, Juan Gris, Marie Laurencin and Marcel Duchamp. The gallery featured pioneering exhibitions which included Fauvism, Orphism, De Stijl, and abstract art with Henri Matisse, Francis Picabia, and Pablo Picasso, in both collective and solo exhibitions. Dalmau published the Dadaist review 391 created by Picabia, and gave support to Troços by Josep Maria Junoy i Muns.

Dalmau was the first gallery in Spain to exhibit works by Juan Gris, the first to host solo exhibitions of works by Albert Gleizes, Francis Picabia, Joan Miró, Salvador Dalí and Angel Planells. It was also the first gallery to exhibit Vibrationism.

The gallery presented native pre-avant-garde artists, tendencies and manifestations new to the Catalan art scene, while also exporting Catalan art abroad, through exhibition-exchange projects, such as promoting the first exhibition by Joan Miró in Paris (1921). Aware of the difficulty and marginality of the innovative art sectors, their cultural diffusion, and promotion criterion beyond any stylistic formula, Dalmau made these experiences the center of the gallery's programming. Dalmau is credited for having introduced avant-garde art to the Iberian Peninsula. Due to Dalmau's activities and exhibitions at the gallery, Barcelona became an important international center for innovative and experimental ideas and methods.

== Background ==
=== Josep Dalmau ===
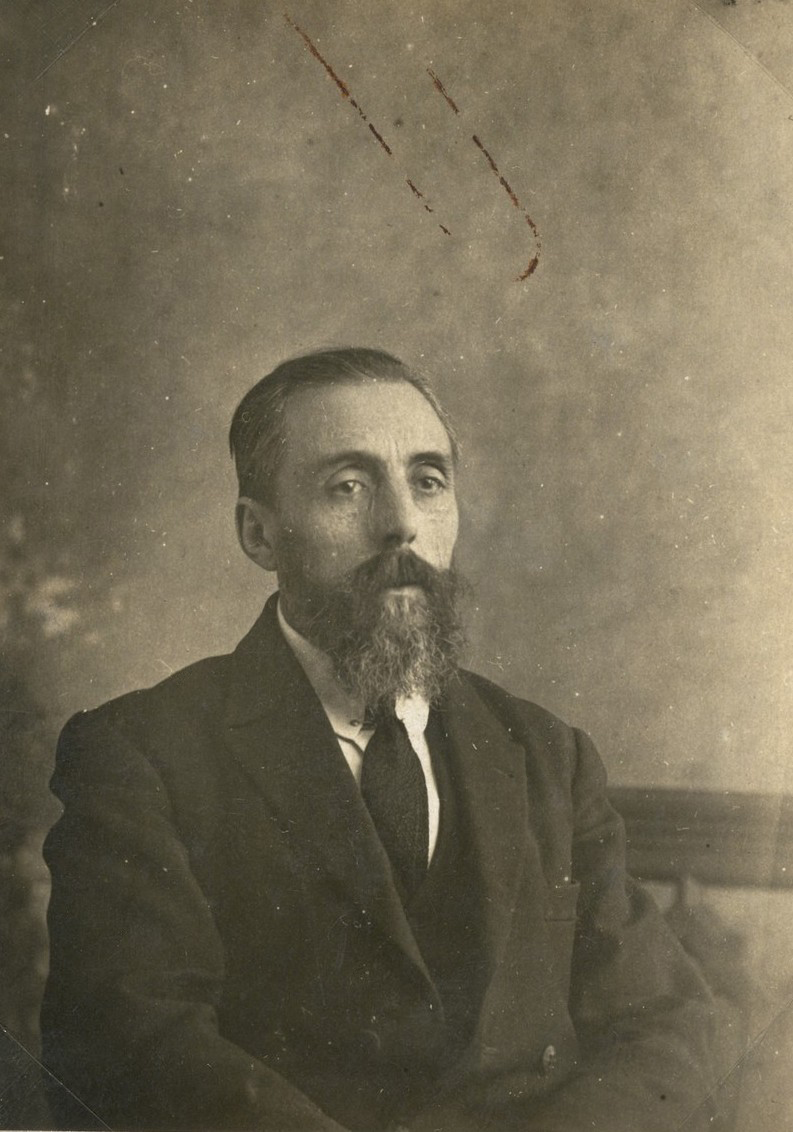
Josep Dalmau i Rafel, c. 1910

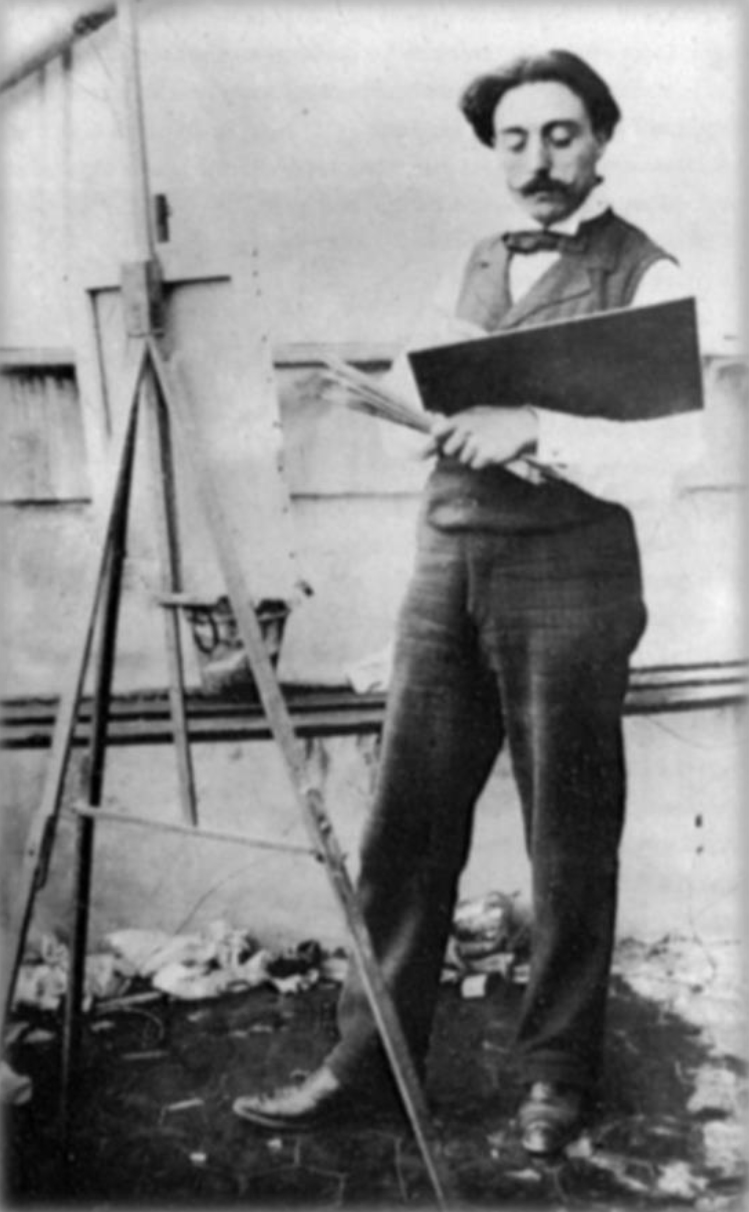
Josep Dalmau, c. 1896

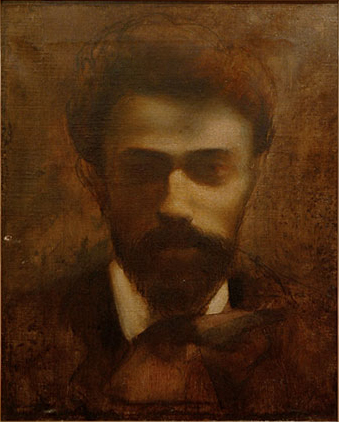
Josep Dalmau i Rafel, c. 1900, Self Portrait (Autorretrato), oil on canvas, Museu Comarcal de Manresa

Born in Manresa, 1867, Josep Dalmau early on devoted himself to painting. In 1884, he moved to Barcelona where he discovered the Modernisme painter Joan Brull. Dalmau's painting were included in several salon exhibitions in Catalonia. In 1899 (8–28 July) he was given his first and only solo exhibition, at Els Quatre Gats, a popular meeting place for artists throughout the modernist period. He continued exhibiting his works throughout his lifetime.

At the age of thirty, he emigrated to Paris where he lived for six years, and studied painting conservation in Bruges and Gant, Belgium.

In 1906, after having finished his studies in restoration, Dalmau returned to Barcelona. He worked as a technical restorer for Museu de Barcelona. In 1914 he restored the complex work of Marià Fortuny, The Battle of Tetuan, 1862–1864. In 1915 he restored the altarpieces for the Board of Museums, known as Junta de Museus de Catalunya.

Dalmau opened an antiques gallery in 1906, Carrer del Pi, 10, becoming his first showroom, lasting from 1906 to 1911. The establishment basically dealt with antique objects, and later extended with a section of modern art. The first documented exhibition of modern art was in 1908, with the exhibition by Josep Mompou i Dencausse and some Japanese prints. The following year Dalmau hosted a joint exhibition of Joan Colom i Agustí, and Isidre Nonell. Dalmau is largely credited for having introduced avant-garde art to Barcelona, and more generally, to Spain. His exhibitions, while promoting international artists, connected Catalan artists with the world of art outside of Spain.

== Les Galeries Dalmau ==
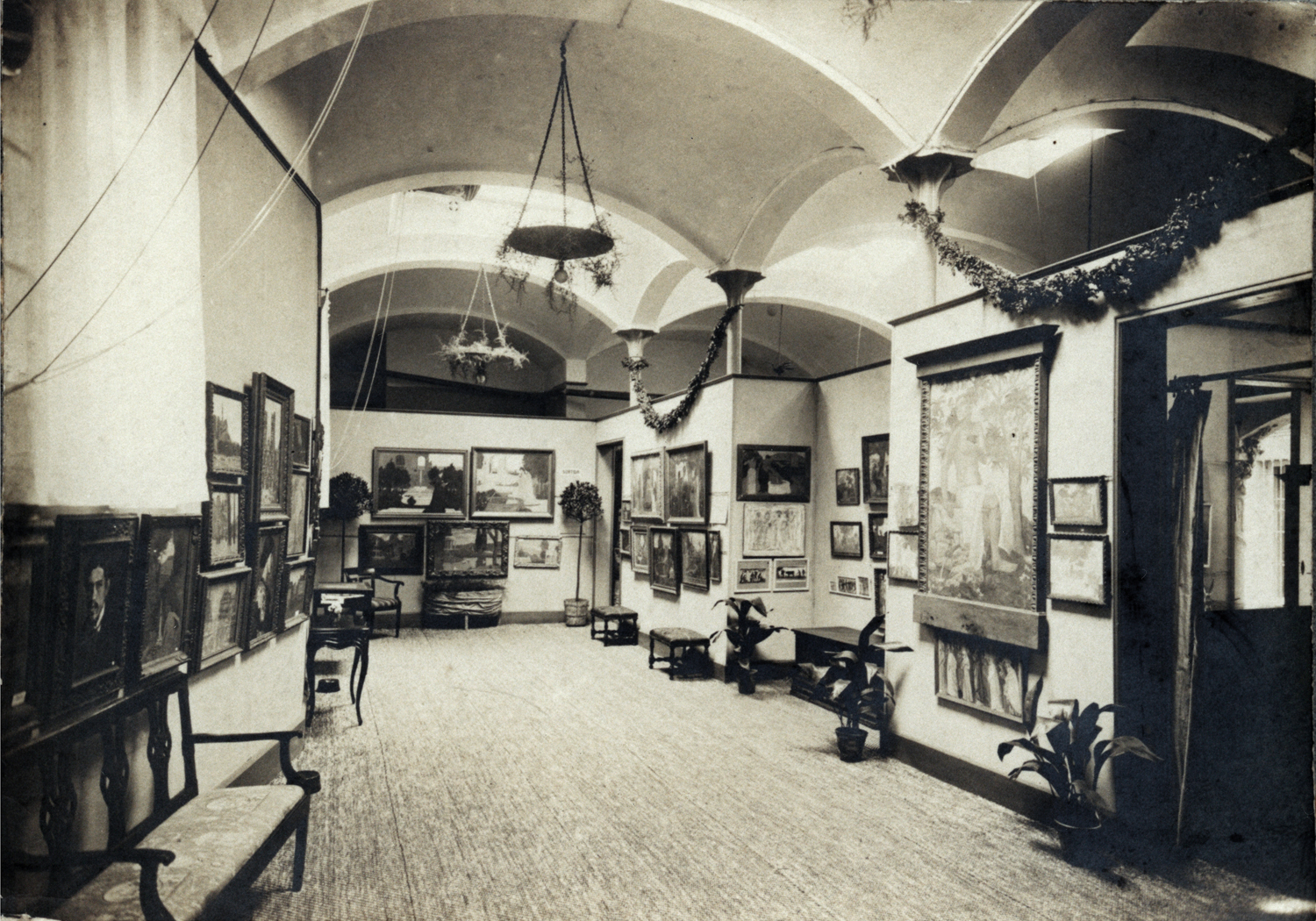
Galeries Dalmau, Joaquín Torres-García exhibition, 1912, Carrer de Portaferrissa, 18, Barcelona

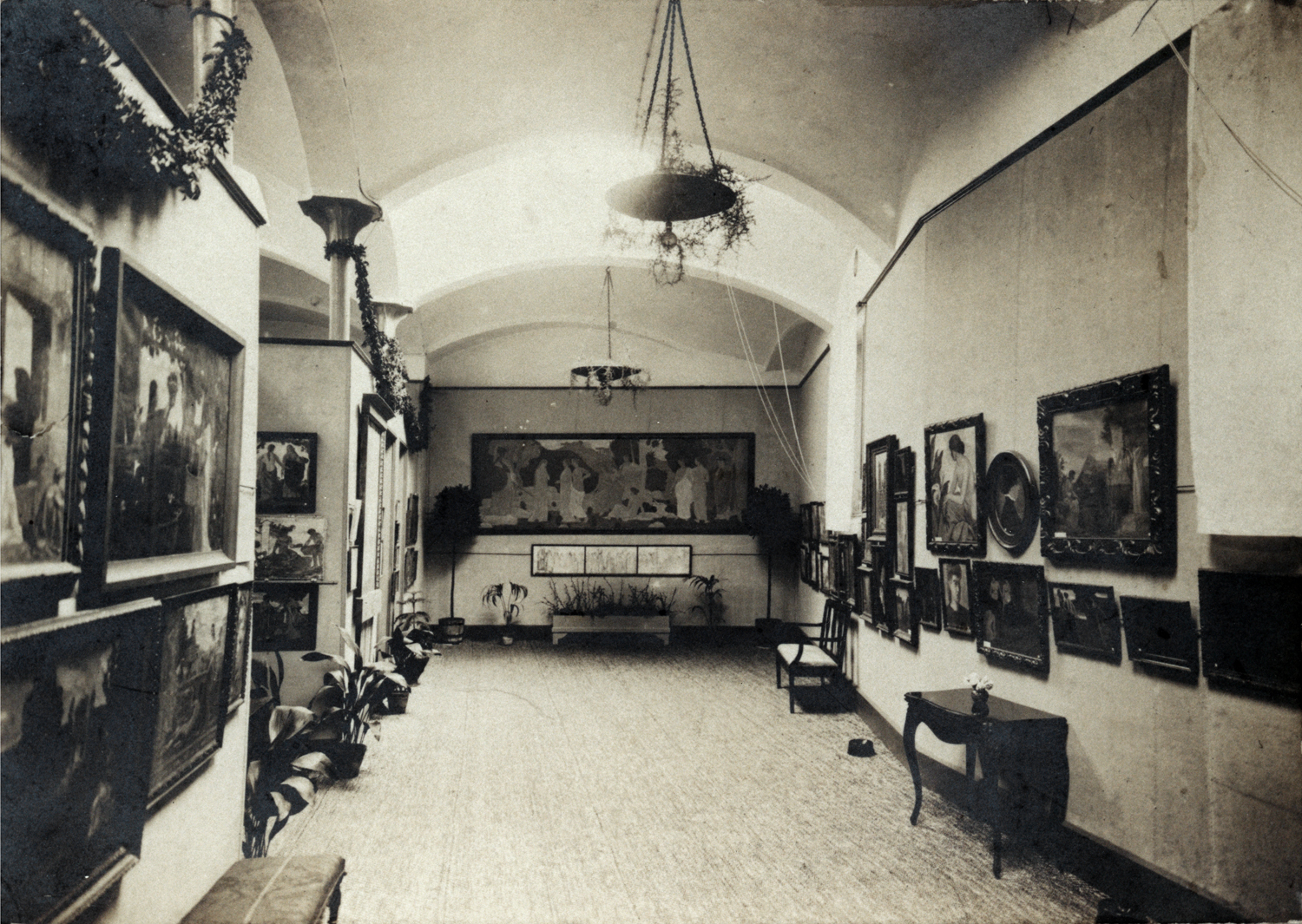
Galeries Dalmau, Joaquín Torres-García exhibition, 1912, Carrer de Portaferrissa, 18, Barcelona

Mid-1911 announced the expansion of the gallery. It was made possible by the revenue obtained in the market of antiques, especially through the import and export from France. It was also made possible from the proceeds of an exhibition of modern and old master portraits and drawings, organized by the City Council of Barcelona the previous year, in which Dalmau participated as an antique dealer with some valuable works by El Greco, Feliu Elias (aka Joan Sacs) and two works by Francisco Goya, Portrait of Manuel Godoy, valued at 15,000 pesetas and Retrato de niño, 8,000 pesetas.

The new establishment located in the Gothic Quarter at Carrer de Portaferrissa, 18, was baptized with the name "Galeries Dalmau" with the goal of combining exhibitions of old masters, modern art, and new art. Dalmau was poised to import foreign avant-garde art into the city of Barcelona, widening the city's cultural horizons.

The exhibition space of the gallery was located in the inner courtyard of a house, with a glass ceiling, typical of photography studio or industrial warehouse. It had a threaded mechanism that regulated the light coming in through the skylight. The space was divided by wooden partitions that did not reach the ceiling, and divided into two or three interconnected spaces, and one office. Access to the gallery passed through a long corridor adorned with anonymous unrestored old master landscapes and still lifes.

For the coming years, this became the platform featuring pioneering exhibitions of Fauvism, Orphism, De Stijl, and abstract art with Francis Picabia, Kees van Dongen, Joaquín Torres-García, Henri Matisse, Juliette Roche, Georges Braque, André Derain, Auguste Herbin, Fernand Léger, André Lhote, Gino Severini, Louis Valtat, Félix Vallotton, Hans Arp, María Blanchard and others in both collective and solo exhibitions.

Art historian Fèlix Fanés writes of the gallery:

To overcome the difficulties of the home market, Dalmau introduced contemporary Catalan art to foreign markets. This strategy, together with the arrival of numerous avant-garde artists in Barcelona during the First World War, served to consolidate the modern image of the Galeries Dalmau. The dealer paved the way for many young people in the tough world of advanced art, having a decisive influence, for example, on the early career of Joan Miró.

=== Selected exhibitions ===
==== 1912: Picasso, Torres-García ====
In 1912 two exhibitions took place consecutively: Joaquín Torres-García, a painter of the Noucentista period; and Pablo Picasso, drawings from his Blue Period (February – March 1912).

==== 1912: Exposició d'Art Cubista ====
Paintings by Henri Le Fauconnier, 1910–11, L'Abondance, Haags Gemeentemuseum; Jean Metzinger, 1911, Le goûter (Tea Time), Philadelphia Museum of Art; Robert Delaunay, 1910–11, La Tour Eiffel. Published in La Veu de Catalunya 1 February 1912

Jean Metzinger, c. 1911, Nature morte, Compotier et cruche décorée de cerfs; Juan Gris, 1911, Study for Man in a Café; Marie Laurencin, c. 1911, Testa ab plechs; August Agero, sculpture, Bust; Juan Gris, 1912, Guitar and Glasses, or Banjo and Glasses. Published in La Veu de Catalunya, 25 April 1912

Paintings by Albert Gleizes, 1910–11, Paysage, Landscape; Juan Gris (drawing); Jean Metzinger, c. 1911, Nature morte (Compotier et cruche décorée de cerfs). Published on the front page of El Correo Catalán, 25 April 1912

Paintings by Juan Gris, Bodegón; August Agero (sculpture); Jean Metzinger, 1910–11, Deux Nus, Two Nudes, Gothenburg Museum of Art; Marie Laurencin (acrylic); Albert Gleizes, 1911, Paysage, Landscape. Published in La Publicidad, 26 April 1912

From 20 April to 10 May 1912, Josep Dalmau exhibited, for the first time in Spain, in his new space located at Carrer de Portaferrissa, 18, a repertoire of Cubist artworks. This was the first worldwide group exhibition solely dedicated to Cubism. Some of the paintings had been shown at the 1911 Salon d'Automne in Paris. The news of this salon had already spread across Europe, and numerous article had been written about the new art. In Catalonia, Eugenio d'Ors wrote of the salon two months before the Dalmau show, 1 February 1912, "Pel cubisme a l'estructuralisme" published in "Pàgines Artístiques de La Veu de Catalunya", within which Ors depicted Cubism as a provisional stage, a consciousness or rational apprenticeship to build "structuralism". This article generated controversy, reflection and discussion between Joan Sacs, Joaquim Folch i Torres, and Joaquín Torres-García.

In Paris, the Cubist works at the 1911 Salon d'Automne resulted in a public scandal that brought Cubism to the attention of the general public for the second time. The first was the organized group showing by Cubists in Salle 41 of the 1911 Salon des Indépendants. Cubist paintings had already been exhibited at the 1910 Salon d'Automne (by Jean Metzinger, Robert Delaunay, Henri Le Fauconnier and Fernand Léger), but not under a group banner or name. The term "Cubisme" was enunciated for the first time for the occasion of the first exhibition to include Cubism outside France: at the Brussels Indépendants, June 1911. And now, the second exhibition beyond the French border was about to take place; the first devoted entirely to Cubism.

This was the backdrop upon which the Barcelona exhibition of Cubist art was set. Josep Dalmau had travelled to Paris to see the 1911 Salon d'Automne. He also visited a Cubist exhibition at Galerie d'Art Ancien et d'Art Contemporain (20 November – 16 December 1911), 3 rue Tronchet, where he met several Cubists, including Metzinger. The Dalmau exhibition comprised 83 works by 26 artists, including the Salon Cubists of Salle 41. He later attended the Indépendants 1912 Salon des Indépendants (March–May).

Mercè Vidal, author of L'Exposició d'Art Cubista de les Galeries Dalmau 1912 writes that Dalmau's initiative was not at random, nor the result of chance. 'The presentation of the Cubists in Barcelona came preceded by the interest of the Catalan artists and critics for that movement, from the moment they had first heard news.'

The opening of the Exposició d'Art Cubista at Les Galeries Dalmau began at 6pm on 20 April 1912. Entrance was strictly by personal invitation. Jacques Nayral's association with Gleizes led him to write the Preface for the Cubist exhibition, which was fully translated and reproduced in the newspaper La Veu de Catalunya. Previously, Jacques Nayral (pseudonym for Jacques Huot), joined forces with Alexandre Mercereau, Gleizes, Metzinger, and Le Fauconnier in planning to publish a review dedicated to the plastic arts. As editor-in-chief of Eugène Figuière publications, he went on to launch as series under the umbrella name Tous les arts, which published the first two seminal books on Cubism: Du "Cubisme" (1912) by Metzinger and Gleizes, and Les Peintres Cubistes, Méditations Esthétiques (1913) by Guillaume Apollinaire. In his Dalmau catalogue Preface, Nayral writes:

the artist must no longer cling to servile imitations, that artistic joy is not produced by the observance of an exact reproduction of appearance, but that it is born of the interaction of our sensibility and our intelligence, that the deeper the artist leads us into the unknown, the more talent he has. A multiple enigma, which does not reveal itself in its integrity and in a single stroke, but gradually and step by step—just as we read a book page by page.

Nayral then cites Metzinger's 1910 concept that their attempt is to realize a "total image" (depicting the subject from a multitude of viewpoints to represent the subject in a greater context), giving "a plastic consciousness to our instinct", and leading to a more profound truth—a "truth that only the intelligence grasps."

It is lyrical poetry... that one would have to express those profound feelings. No, not even that: in exchange for a supreme and marvelous selfish joy, it would be better not to try to analyze that divine sensation of mystery, that communion with the great unknown, which the contemplation of pure beauty elicits in the depths of our souls.

Extensive media coverage (in newspapers and magazines) before, during and after the exhibition launched the Galeries Dalmau as a force in the development and propagation of modernism in Europe.

Cubists artists consisted of Jean Metzinger, Albert Gleizes, Marcel Duchamp, Juan Gris, Marie Laurencin, August Agero, with works by Henri Le Fauconnier and Fernand Léger listed in the supplement of the catalogue.

Jean Metzinger was considered the most representative of the Cubists. He exhibited a Study for "Le Goûter" (1911), which was printed on an advertising poster for the Cubist show at Dalmau, and two paintings, Nature morte (Compotier et cruche décorée de cerfs) (1910–11) and Deux Nus (Two Nudes, Two Women) (1910–11). Albert Gleizes exhibited Paysage (Landscape, Les Maisons) (1910–11), Le Chemin, Paysage à Meudon, Paysage avec personnage (1911), Study for the portrait of Jacques Nayral, a drawing entitled El año, and three more untitled works. Marcel Duchamp showed La sonate (Sonata) (1911) and Nude Descending a Staircase, No. 2 (1912) was exhibited for the first time. Juan Gris was represented by Nu, four untitled oils, and five drawings. Marie Laurencin showed two watercolors, two oils, two drawings and six etchings. August Agero, presented a Statue of man, Statue of woman, Bust of man, Jeune fille à la rose, a series of dishes, including one titled Adam and Eva (copper plate) and five drawings. Le Fauconnier exhibited Portrait d'un Poète and two landscapes of Brittany. Fernand Léger had three drawings in the show.

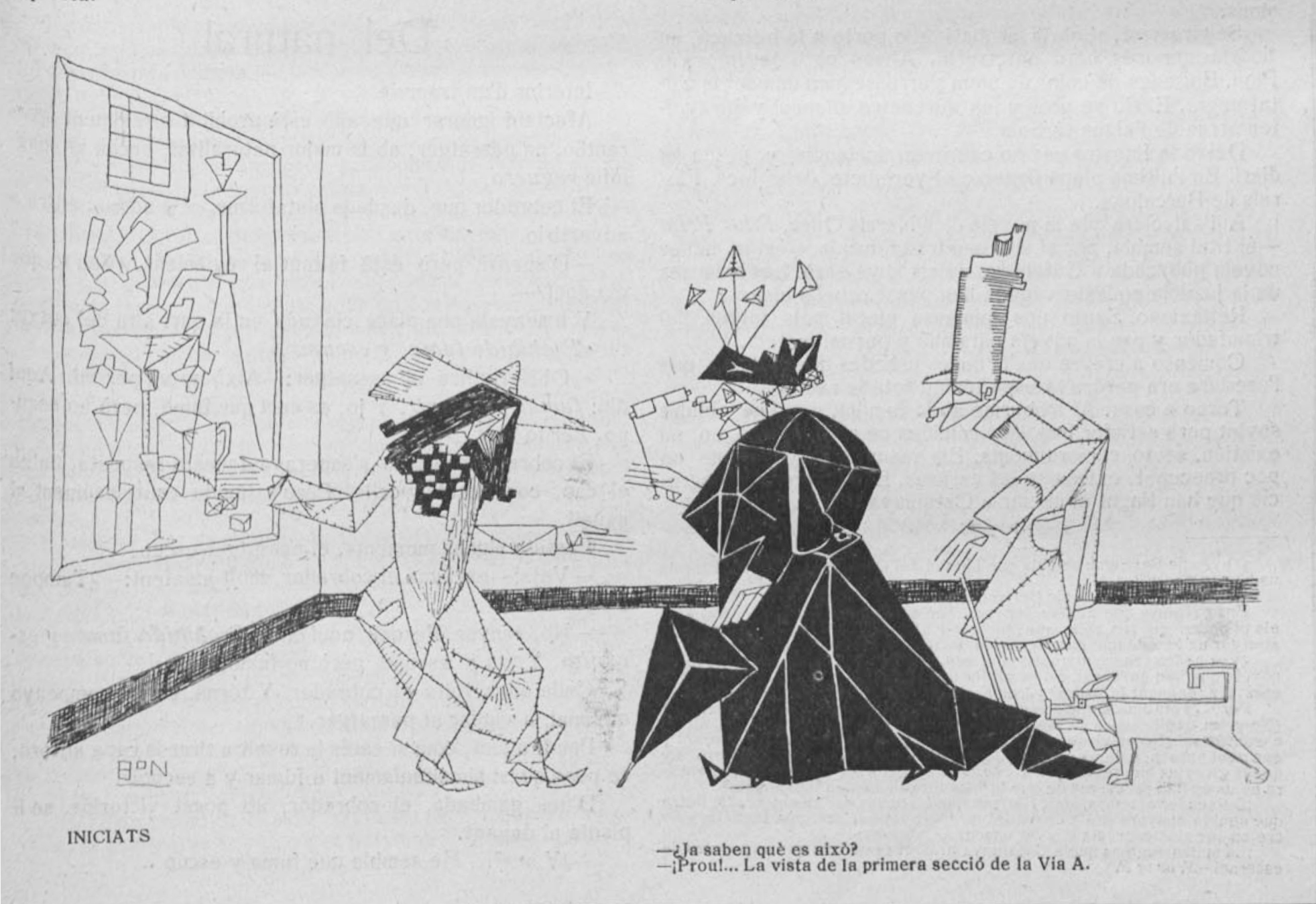
Cubist caricature referencing the Dalmau exhibition, published in Esquella de La Torratxa, 3 May 1912

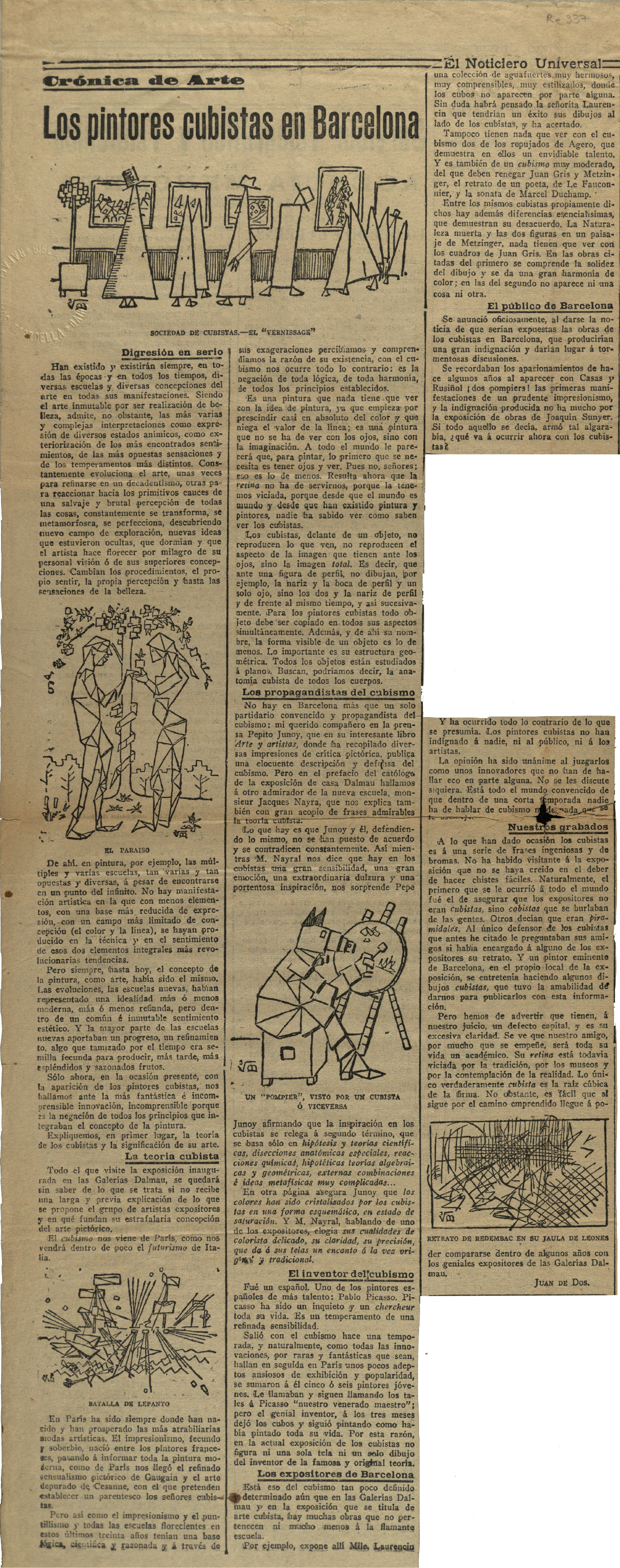
Cubist caricatures referencing the Dalmau exhibition, published in El Noticiero Universal, 25 April 1912

While press coverage was extensive, it was not always positive. Articles were published in the newspapers Esquella de La Torratxa and El Noticiero Universal attacking the Cubists with a series of caricatures laced with text, showing people shaped like cones standing in front of the works. Another depicted Adam and Eve in crude cubic form (Agero presented a sculpture of the subject). Others still interpreted the paintings as cubic scribbles, or an artist at his easel with a cube-like animal head; all with derogatory captions. Others mocked the works, referring to them as "hieroglyphs". Among artists reactions were mixed, sparking a debate among Noucentists. Eugenio d'Ors saw Duchamps Nude Descending a Staircase as a "sad case, a case of unconsciousness and disorientation". In another article he referred to Duchamps Nude as "monstrous", because the artist renounced form and a sensual appearance of reality, contradicting the efforts of other Cubists. The following year Nude Descending a Staircase, No. 2 was exhibited at the Armory Show where it became the subject of endless scandal.

Art historian Jaime Brihuega writes of the Dalmau Cubist show: "No doubt that the exhibition produced a strong commotion in the public, who welcomed it with a lot of suspicion. Cubism subsequently became one of the most influential art movements of the 20th century; impacting developments in Futurism, Suprematism, Dada, Constructivism, De Stijl and Art Deco. while Constructivism was influenced by Picasso's technique of constructing sculpture from separate elements.

Selected works exhibited or reproduced in the press

Jean Metzinger, 1910–11, Deux Nus (Two Nudes, Two Women), oil on canvas, 92 × 66 cm, Gothenburg Museum of Art, Sweden. Exhibited at the first Cubist manifestation, Room 41 of the 1911 Salon des Indépendants, Paris. Exposició d'Art Cubista, 1912

Jean Metzinger, 1911, Étude pour "Le Goûter" (Study for Tea Time), Exposició d'Art Cubista, Galeries Dalmau (catalogue)

Jean Metzinger, 1911, Étude pour "Le Goûter" (Study for Tea Time), graphite and ink on paper, 19 × 15 cm, Musée National d'Art Moderne, Centre Georges Pompidou, Paris. Exposició d'Art Cubista, 1912

Jean Metzinger, 1911, Le goûter (Tea Time), oil on canvas, 75.9 × 70.2 cm, Philadelphia Museum of Art. Exhibited at the 1911 Salon d'Automne. Published in Fantasio, 15 October 1911, Du "Cubisme", 1912, Les Peintres Cubistes, 1913, and in La Veu de Catalunya, 1 February 1912. André Salmon dubbed this painting "The Mona Lisa of Cubism"

Jean Metzinger, c. 1911, Nature morte (Compotier et cruche décorée de cerfs), oil on canvas, 93.5 × 66.5 cm. Exposició d'Art Cubista, 1912

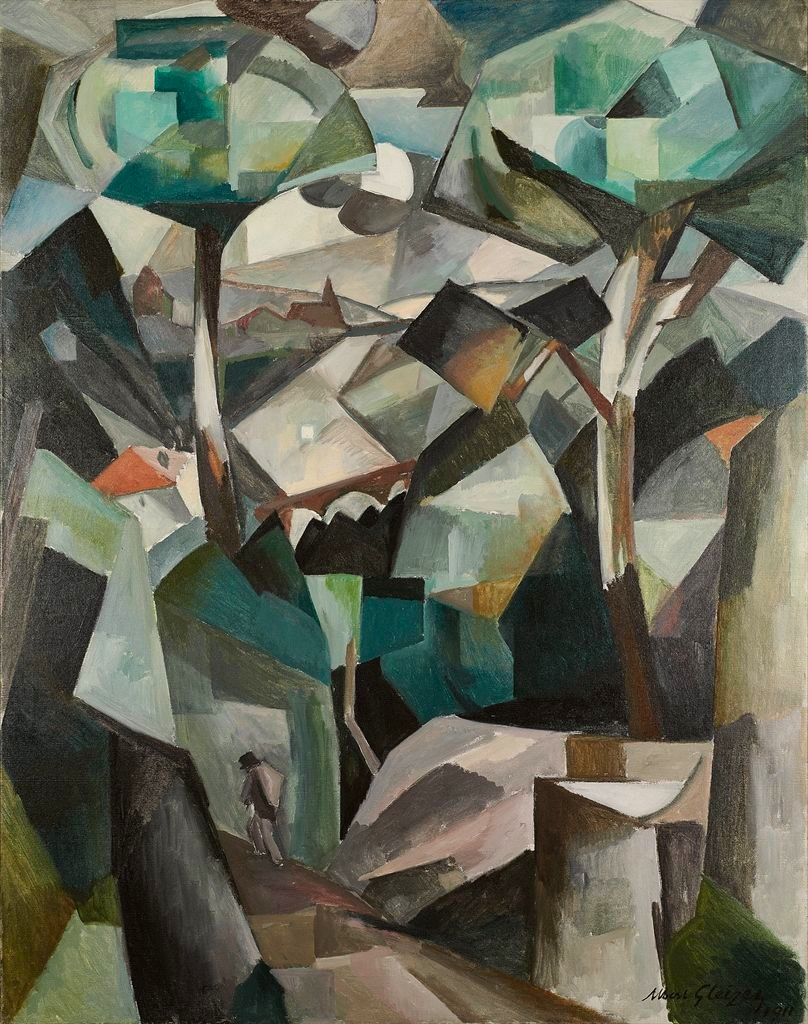
Albert Gleizes, 1911, Le Chemin, Paysage à Meudon, Paysage avec personnage, oil on canvas, 146.4 × 114.4 cm. Exhibited at Salon des Indépendants, 1911, Bruxelles, 1911, Exposició d'Art Cubista, 1912

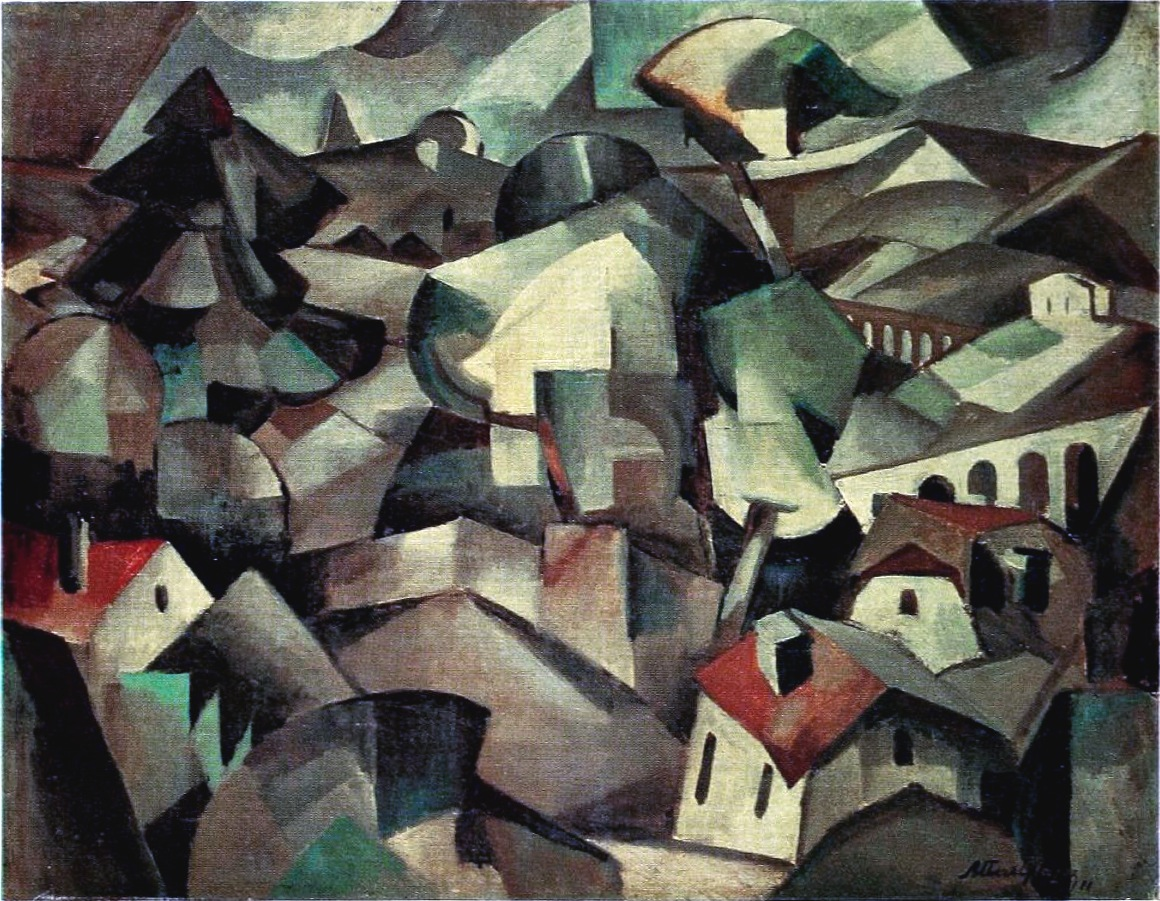
Albert Gleizes, 1910–11, Paysage (Landscape, Les Maisons), oil on canvas, 71 × 91.5 cm. Reproduced frontispiece (titled Les Maisons, dated 1910) catalogue Galeries Dalmau, Exposició d'Art Cubista, Barcelona, 1912

Marcel Duchamp, 1911, La sonate (Sonata), oil on canvas, 145.1 × 113.3 cm, Philadelphia Museum of Art. Exposició d'Art Cubista, Barcelona, 1912

Marcel Duchamp, 1912, Nude Descending a Staircase, No. 2, oil on canvas, 147 cm × 89.2 cm, Philadelphia Museum of Art. Exposició d'Art Cubista, Barcelona, 1912

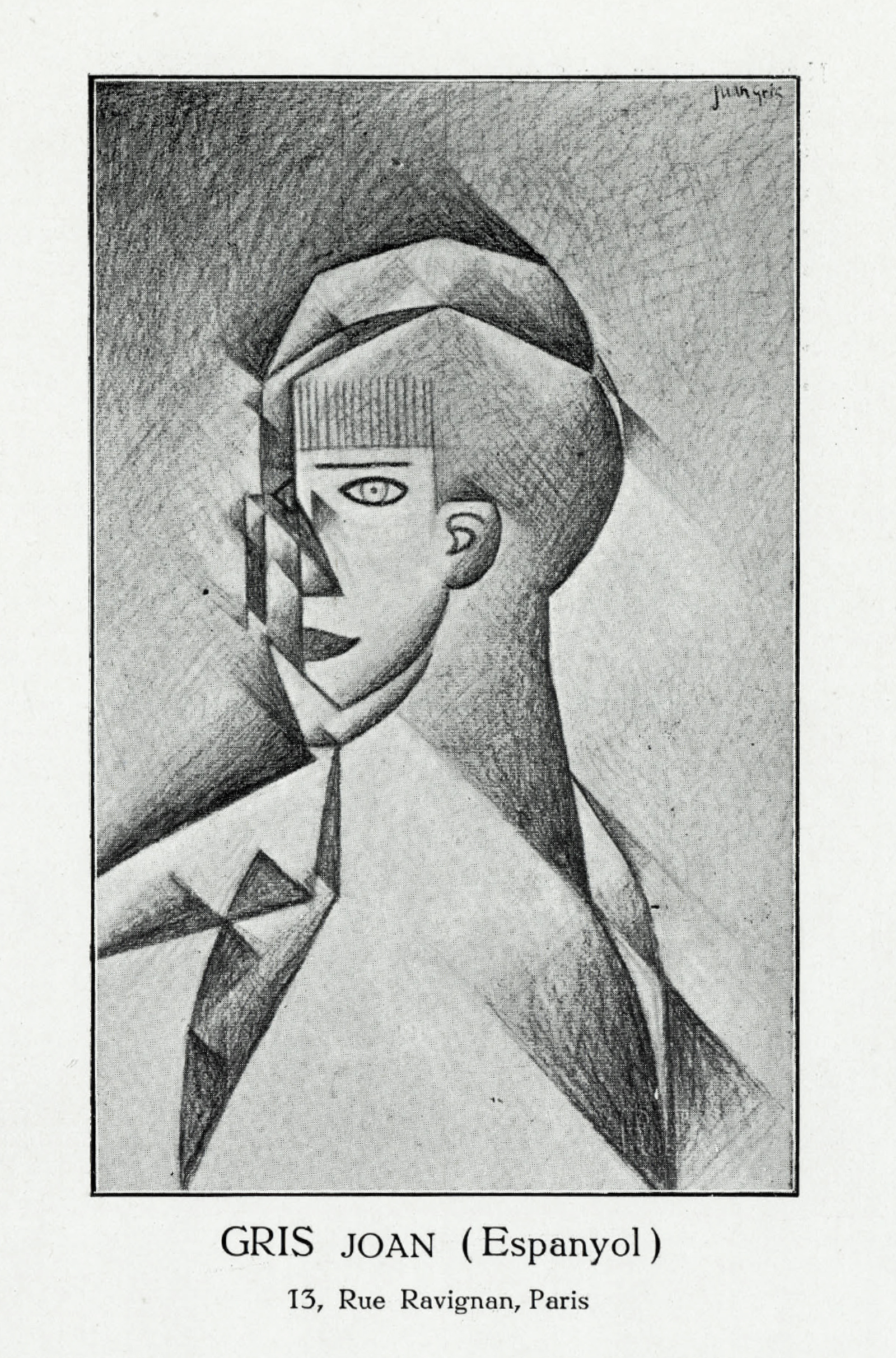
Juan Gris, Exposició d'Art Cubista, Galeries Dalmau, Barcelona, 1912 (catalogue page)

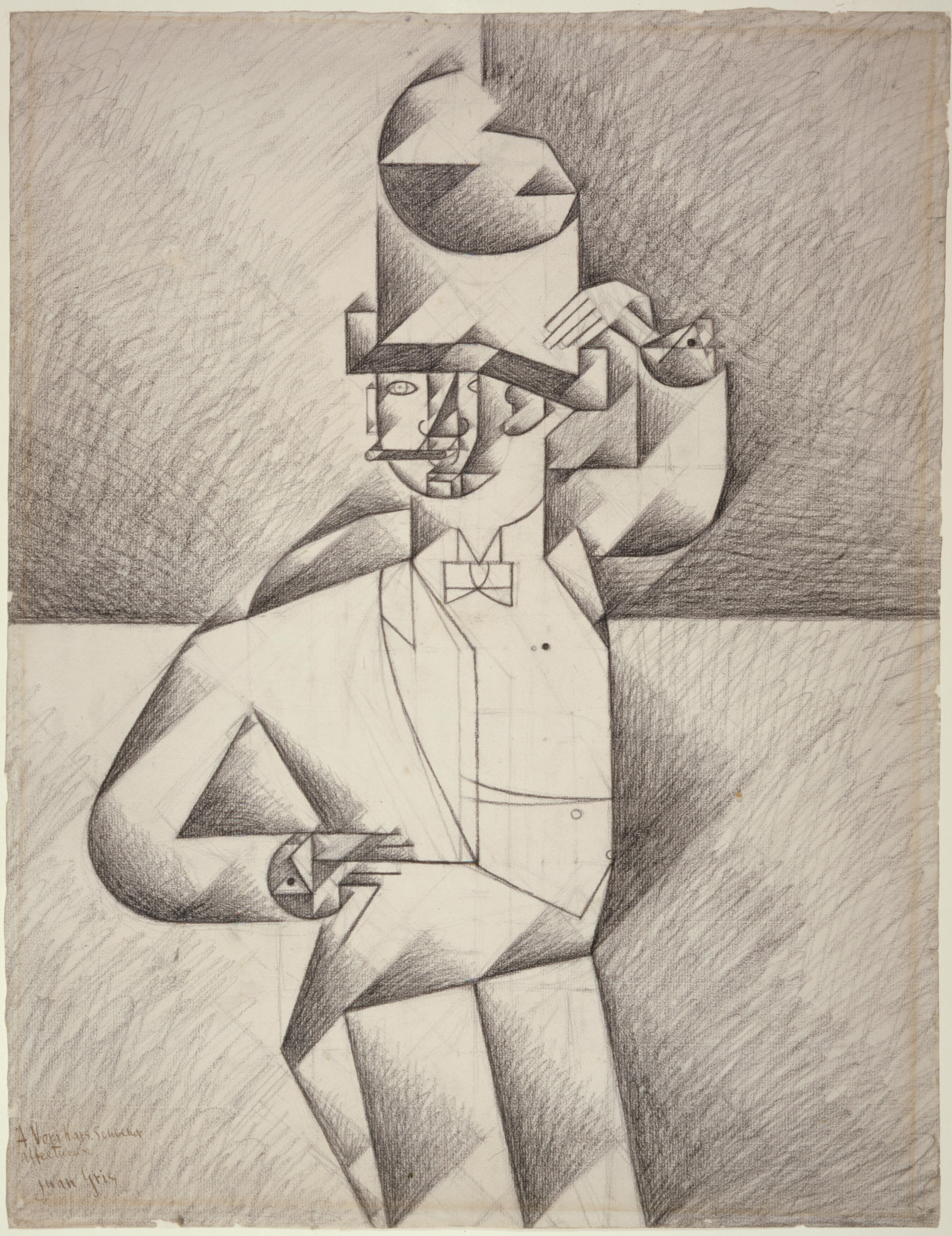
Juan Gris, 1911, Study for "Man in a Café", black crayon on laid paper, 55.9 × 41.9 cm, Philadelphia Museum of Art. Exposició d'Art Cubista, 1912

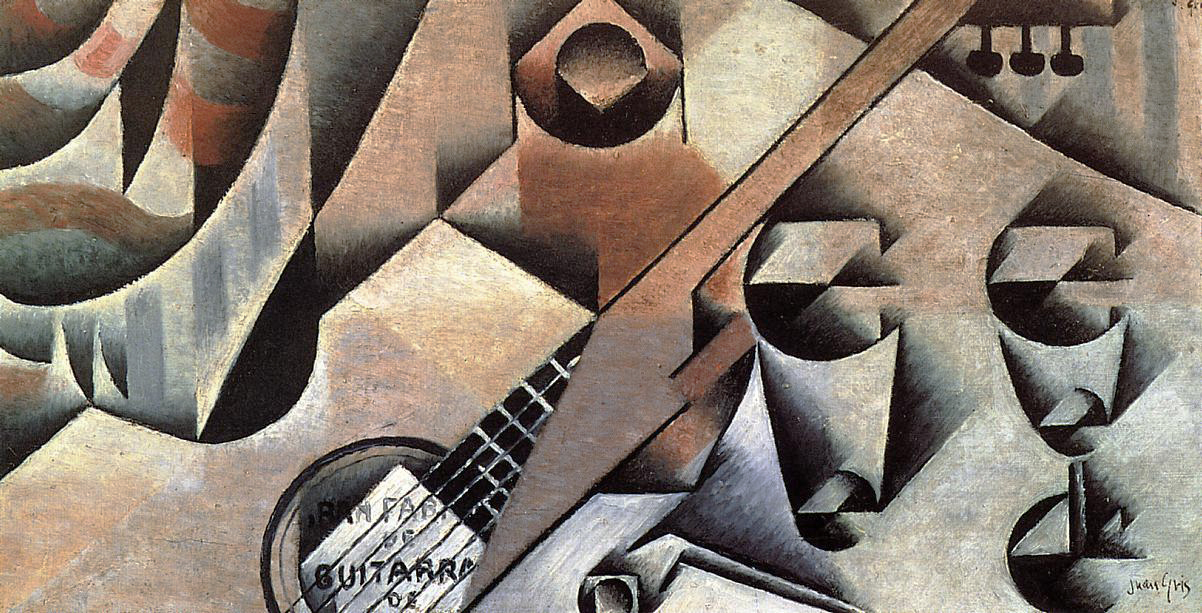
Juan Gris, 1912, La Guitare (Guitar and Glasses), oil on canvas, 30 × 58 cm, private collection. Exposició d'Art Cubista, Barcelona, 1912

Marie Laurencin, Exposició d'Art Cubista, Galeries Dalmau, Barcelona, 1912 (catalogue)

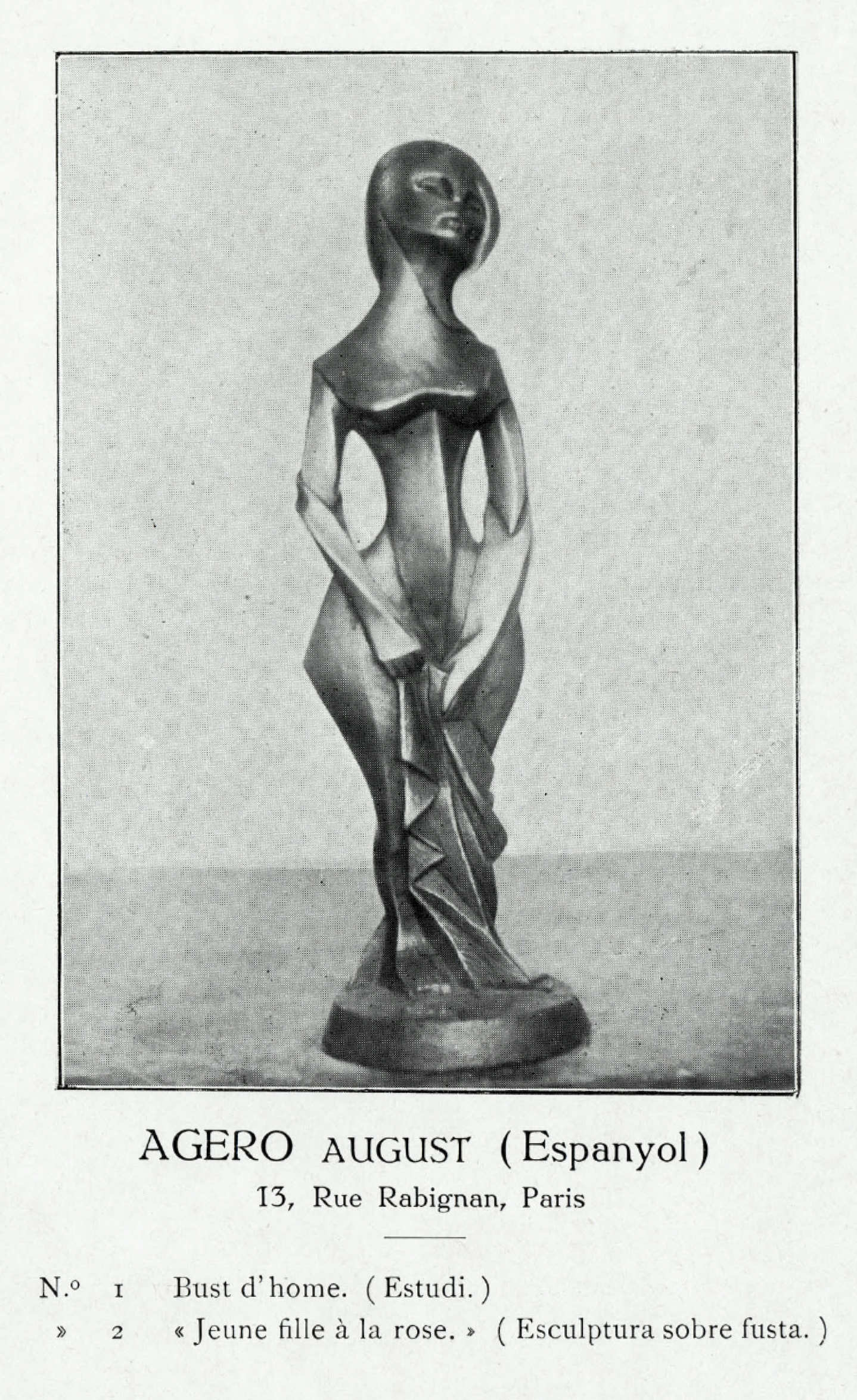
August Agero, Jeune fille à la rose, wood sculpture, Exposició d'Art Cubista, Galeries Dalmau, Barcelona, 1912, catalogue

==== 1912: Exposició d'art polonès ====
This was large exhibition of Polish artists living in France transpired at Dalmau during the months of May and June 1912.

==== 1913–1915: Divers artists ====
Between 1913 and 1915 the gallery held a series of exhibitions by local artists, such as Darío de Regoyos (1913–14), Josep Aragay i Blanchart (1913), Pere Torné i Esquius (1913–14), Laura Albéniz Jordana (1914), Gustavo de Maeztu (1914), Celso Lagar (1915).

==== 1915–16: Kees van Dongen ====
Kees van Dongen exhibited at Galeries Dalmau 26 December 1915 – mid-January 1916. By the time this solo exhibition made it to the walls of Sala Dalmau, van Dongen was already known in Catalonia. Eugenio d'Ors had written about his work in the newspaper El Poble Català (19 August 1905), and Joan Sacs (Feliu Elias) had already dedicated an article to him in Magazine Nova (4/7/1914). Seven works by van Dongen were shown: Tanger, Vacances, Cousine, Le chrysanthème, Intérieur, Portrait of the Princesse Salomé Andreeif and Danseuse orientale.

In Vell i Nou 15 December 1915 it was written that the artist "has managed to interpret with a sweet smile the hell of vice and the perversity of life in the underworld of Paris", and La Veu de Catalunya 11 December recalled of his work "the especially preeminent place that it occupies among the most advanced pictorial schools". The exhibition was well received by L'Esquella de la Torratxa, 14 January 1916, and the magazine Themis, by Vilanova i la Geltrú, 5 January, in which J.F. Ràfols wrote a detailed account of van Dongen work, although not without some reticence, as he described a "believer exceeded by the artificiality of the type of woman, make-up and frivolous, portrayed by the artist. In Vell i Nou, Romà Jori wrote: "from the union between symbolist poets and impressionist painters this painting is born, which has Van Dongen as one of its most solid representatives".

==== 1916: Serge Charchoune, Helene Grunhoff ====
The exhibition of Serge Charchoune and Helene Grunhoff took place 29 April through 14 May 1916. Charchoune attended academies in Moscow before his 1912 arrival in Paris, where he studied Cubism under Jean Metzinger and Le Fauconnier at Académie de La Palette. While in Paris he met the sculptor Hélène Grunhoff (or Helena Grünhoff) (1880–?), with whom he would live for ten years. In 1915, with the outset of World War I, Charchoune and Grunhoff took refuge in Mallorca and Barcelona. The two exhibited again at Galeries Dalmau in 1917.

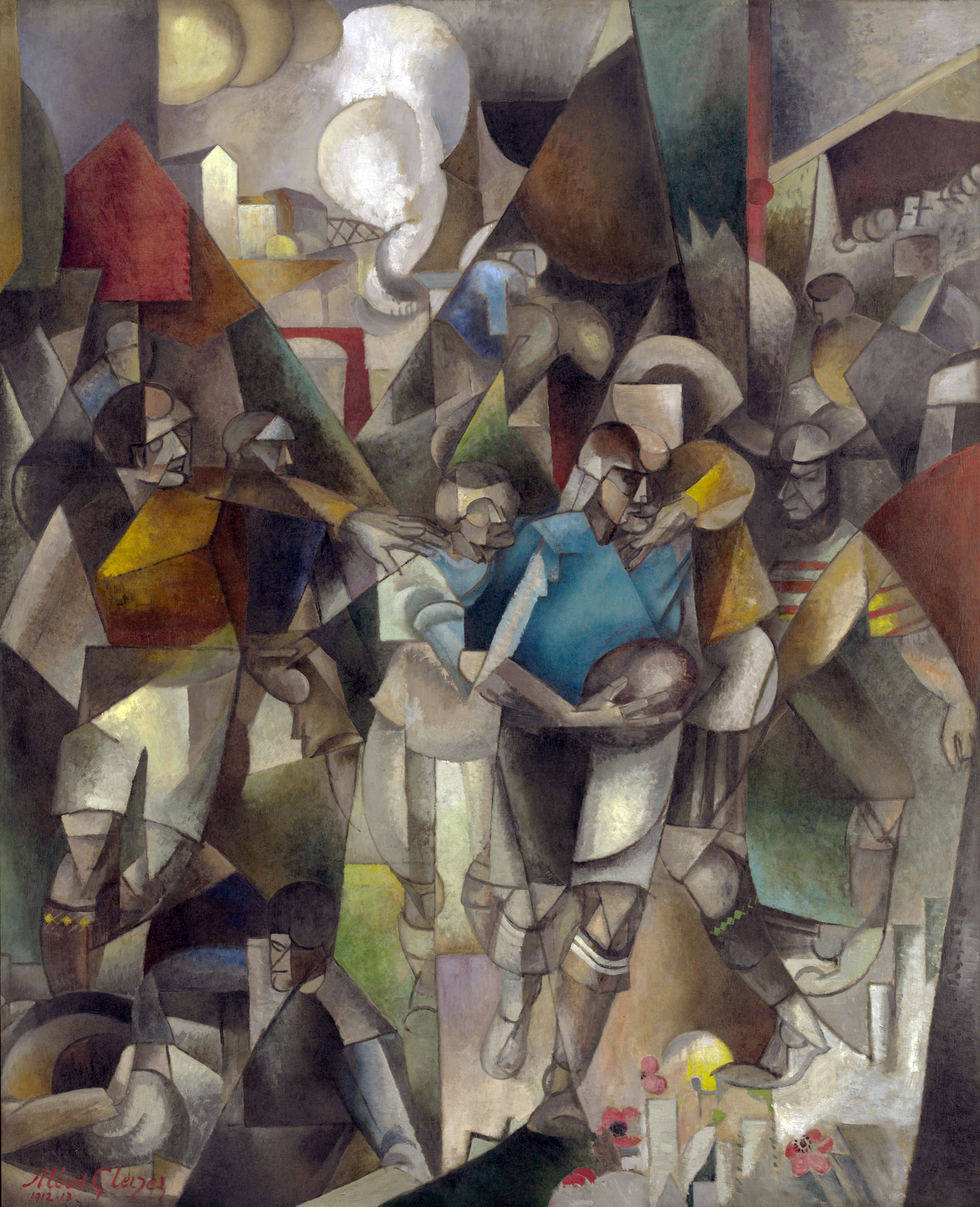
Albert Gleizes, 1912–13, Les Joueurs de football (Football Players), oil on canvas, 225.4 × 183 cm, National Gallery of Art, Washington D.C. Galeries Dalmau, 1916

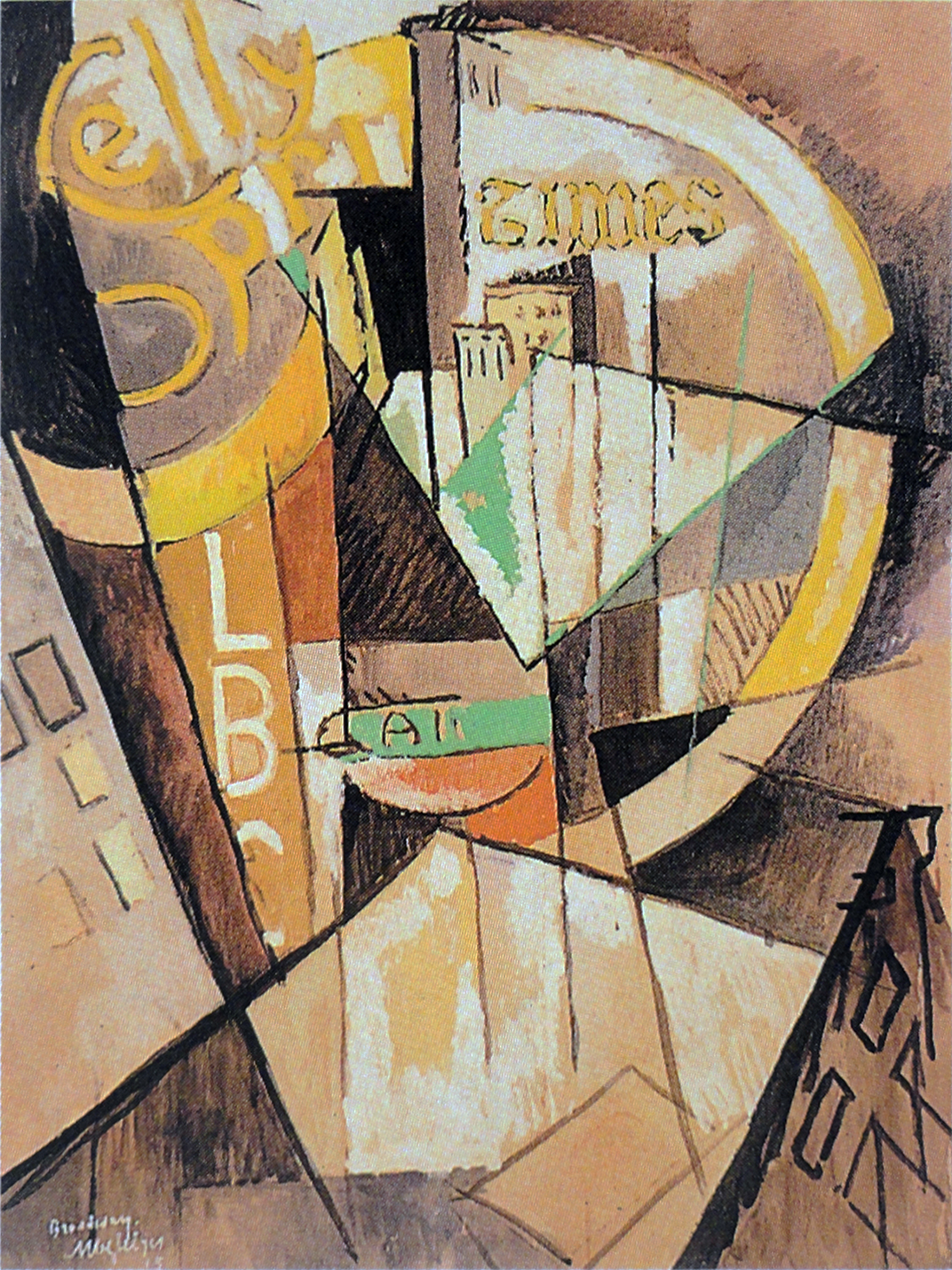
Albert Gleizes, 1915, Broadway, oil on board, 98.5 × 76 cm, private collection. Exhibited Galeries Dalmau, Barcelona, 1916, n. 11 or 12, titled Broadway New York, 1915. Galeries Dalmau, 1916

==== 1916: Albert Gleizes ====
By 1916 the Galeries Dalmau had become a focal point for abstract art and Cubist activities. Albert and Juliette Gleizes, Robert and Sonia Delaunay, Francis Picabia, Marie Laurencin and her husband Otto von Wätjen, Olga Sacharoff, Serge Charchoune and Rafael Barradas were among the artists to adopt Barcelona as their new home; others included the film theoretician and publisher of the avant-garde magazine Montjoie!, Ricciotto Canudo; artist and boxer Arthur Cravan, his brother Otho Lloyd; poet, painter, playwright, choreographer Valentine de Saint-Point, and art critic Max Goth (Maximilien Gauthier).

Spain remained neutral during World War I, between July 1914 and November 1918. Despite domestic economic difficulties, many artists chose to reside in Spain (and Barcelona in particular).

Gleizes' solo exhibition at Dalmau took place 29 November – 12 December 1916, generating considerable press coverage, for example in Vell i Nou, and by Joan Sacs (Feliu Elias), who under another pseudonym, Apa, drew a caricature of Gleizes, in La Publicidad.

Art historian Daniel Robbins writes of the Barcelona works of Gleizes:

His work was always directly engaged with environment, especially an unfamiliar one. Thus, his 1916 voyage to Spain resulted in a number of obviously Spanish paintings, (Spanish Dancer) hot and exuberant (as well as in a lost Sailboat painting, more consonant with the general course of his development in synthetic abstraction) and few of his paintings are as sensual and immediate as those of Bermuda in which a Cezannesque concern for light-modified forms and his consistent diagonal brushwork overcome any conceptual efforts.

==== 1917: Torres-García, Barradas, Charchoune ====
At this exhibition, featuring Joaquim Torres i García, Rafael Barradas y Serge Charchoune, Vibrationism was exhibited publicly for the first time. In a conference held at Galeries Dalmau, 22 February 1917, Torres-García delivered a lecture in which he cites:

This spirit does come to us without enthusiasm, and this is another characteristic. We are engulfed in flame, we vibrate; our spirit is vibratory, agile; it covers immense spaces in seconds; we feel in ourselves the conviction that we can achieve extraordinary things. Good things fall to us; we become altruistic, sincere, indulgent, cordial. The world is beautiful, exuberant with life, with heat, with light. Serenity, like a sovereign, reigns over everything. The world enjoys perpetual peace.

==== 1918: Joan Miró ====
Joan Miró, April 1917, Portrait of Vincent Nubiola (Portrait de Vincenç Nubiola), oil on canvas, 104 × 113 cm, Folkwang Museum. Exhibited Galeries Dalmau, 1918, catalogue no. 46

Joan Miró, 1920, Horse, Pipe and Red Flower, oil on canvas, 82.6 × 74.9 cm, Philadelphia Museum of Art. Exposició d'Art francès d'Avantguarda, Galeries Dalmau, Barcelona, 1920

By 1917 the young Joan Miró, appreciably affected by the Cubist works exhibited at Galeries Dalmau, became involved in the gallery efforts, and soon applied his own personal interpretation to the Cubist approach. 16 February through 3 March 1918 Dalmau presented Miró's first solo exhibition, and would later arrange his first Parisian solo exhibition, at Galerie la Licorne in 1921.

The Galeries Dalmau exhibition of Joan Miró was accompanied by a catalogue with a calligram poem by Josep Maria Junoy. Listed are a total of 64 works: 2 dated 1914; 7 dated 1915; 25 from 1916; and 30 works from 1917. Reports are that the show was not a success, his work was ridiculed and defaced.

Miró's submissions reflected the influence of French movements, Impressionism, Fauvism, and Cubism, with colors akin to van Gogh and Cézanne (such as Portrait of Vincent Nubiola), as well as the influence of van Dongen and Gleizes. The reaction among critics was mixed, and Miró only managed to sell one work, a still life of a coffee grinder, which was purchased by Catalan artist Josep Mompou (who exhibited at Galeries Dalmau in 1908) for 250 pesetas.

Miró subsequently was drawn towards the arts community gathering momentum in Montparnasse and in 1920 moved to Paris, but continued to spend his summers in Catalonia.

==== 1920: Exposición de Arte francés de Vanguardia ====
The Exposición de Arte francés de Vanguardia transpired at Les Galeries Dalmau 26 October through 15 November 1920. The exhibition of avant-garde French art was one of the most important exhibitions organized by Dalmau, in which the dealer's intention was to offer a representative sample of artists who worked in France, both French and other nationalities. The sheer number of artists was vast, and so too the range of periods covered; from post-Impressionism to abstract art, Fauvism, Cubism and De Stijl in passing.

It was at this exhibition, in all probability, that dealer Léonce Rosenberg and Miró met for the first time. Dalmau had organized the show with the help of Rosenberg and of Georges Bernheim, the gallery owner and international art expert during the Parisian interwar period. He had exhibited works by Francis Picabia, Raoul Dufy, and many others at the Galerie Georges Bernheim. Virtually all of the Cubists in the show had already exhibited at Rosenberg's Galerie de L'Effort Moderne, or would shortly. In 1930 and 1932, Rosenberg presented two large exhibitions of works by Picabia.

Artists included María Blanchard, Georges Braque, Henri-Edmond Cross, Jean Dufy, Raoul Dufy, André Derain, André Dunoyer de Segonzac, Emile-Othon Friesz, Albert Gleizes, Juan Gris, Henri Hayden, Auguste Herbin, Marie Laurencin, Fernand Léger, André Lhote, Jacques Lipchitz, Henri Manguin, Jean Marchand, Albert Marquet, Henri Matisse, Jean Metzinger, Joan Miró, Pablo Picasso, Diego Rivera, Gino Severini, Paul Signac, Joaquim Sunyer, Léopold Survage, Louis Valtat, Félix Vallotton, Kees van Dongen, Maurice de Vlaminck, and Manuel Ortíz de Zárate. In all, 45 artists participated with 87 works of art displayed.

The preface of the catalogue was written by French art critic and an ardent propagandist of Cubism Maurice Raynal. 28 artworks were reproduced in the catalogue.

Maurice Raynal delivered a surreal preface laced with philosophy, theology, seemingly geared towards the collectors inner sensibility:

Afición ciega razón, says a Spanish proverb. Well! yes. It is necessary that affection blinds reason. So do not try here to discriminate against efforts divergent from sensibility and sensuality. Look and choose, or rather let yourself be taken, stop in front of what captures you, because we never choose. ... love does not choose, it takes what it finds. So do not try to compare and therefore do not label. Only true love has to make comparisons, and the elective character we would like to bestow upon it is only a pleasant fantasy around its power. ... Breathe nature only with all the pores of your sensitivity, contemplate the universe through your window or in your own mirror if you prefer. This one tell you: "This is what nature has shown me". That one will affirm: "That is what I showed nature". Just remember that we only have at home the painting that we deserve. (Maurice Raynal, 1920)

Pablo Picasso, 1903, Desemparats (Maternité, Mère et enfant au fichu, Motherhood), pastel on paper, 47.5 × 41 cm, Museu Picasso, Barcelona. Exposició d'Art francès d'Avantguarda, Galeries Dalmau, Barcelona, 1920

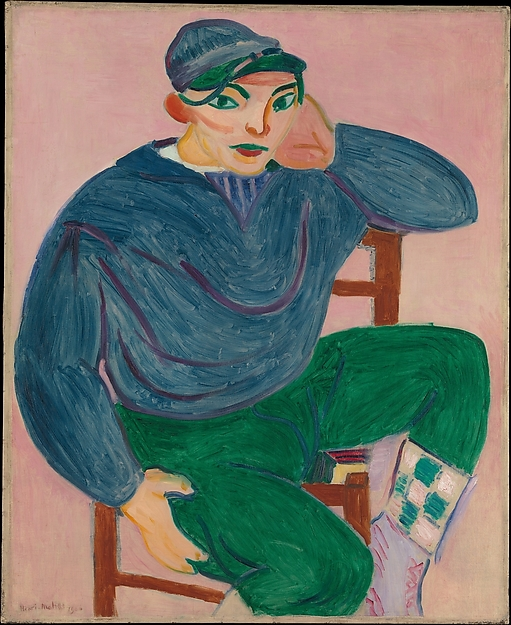
Henri Matisse, 1906, The Young Sailor II, oil on canvas, 101.3 × 82.9 cm, Metropolitan Museum of Art. Exposició d'Art francès d'Avantguarda, Galeries Dalmau, Barcelona, 1920

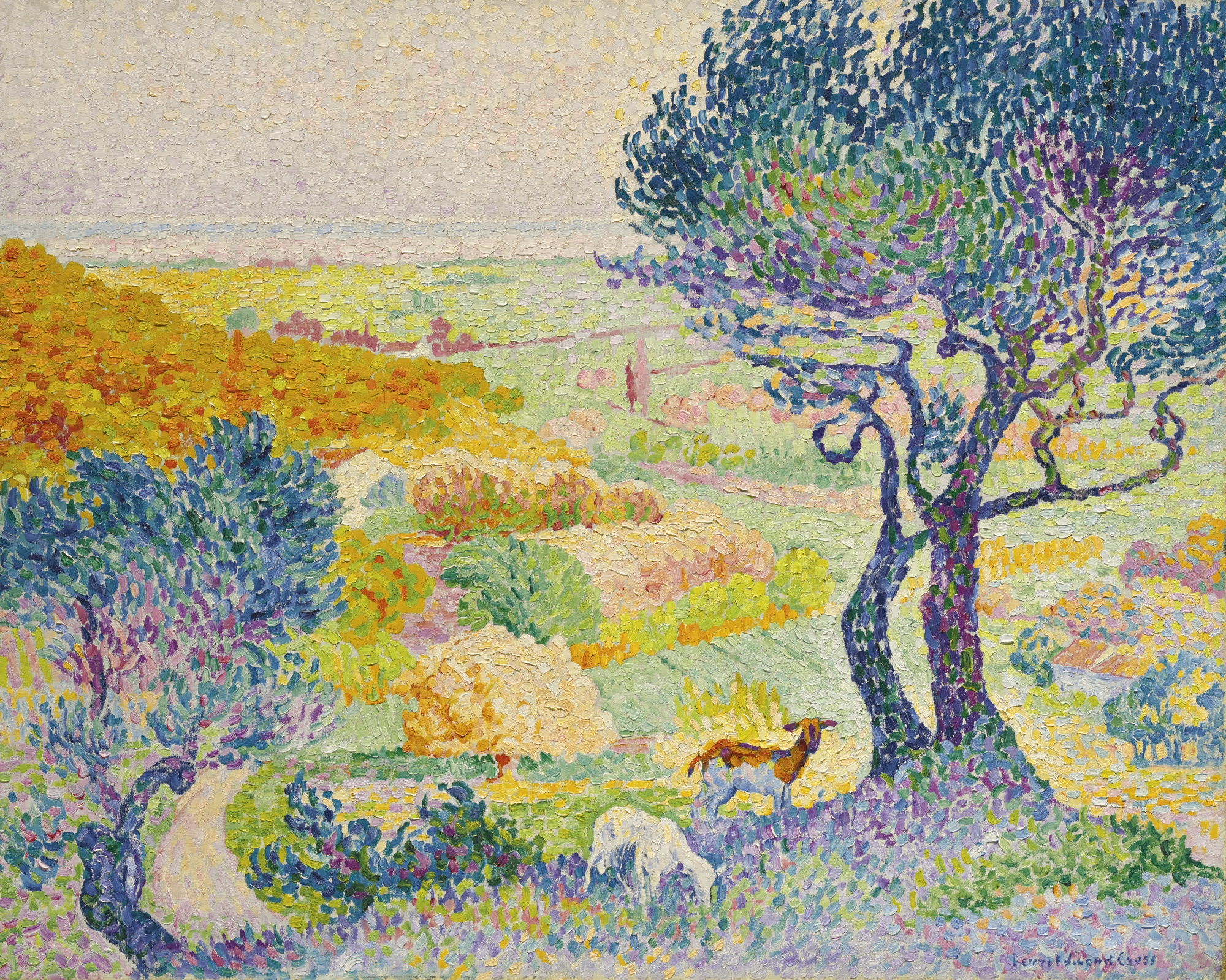
Henri-Edmond Cross, 1907–08, La Pleine de Bormes, oil on canvas, 73.1 × 91.8 cm. Exposició d'Art francès d'Avantguarda, Galeries Dalmau, Barcelona, 1920

Kees van Dongen, 1911, En la plaza (Femme a la balustrade, Woman on the balustrade), oil on canvas, 81.3 × 99.1 cm, Annonciade Museum, Saint Tropez. Exposició d'Art francès d'Avantguarda, Galeries Dalmau, Barcelona, 1920

Auguste Herbin, 1912, Les roses, oil on canvas, 92.1 × 60.3 cm. Exposició d'Art francès d'Avantguarda, Galeries Dalmau, Barcelona, 1920 (page from the catalogue)

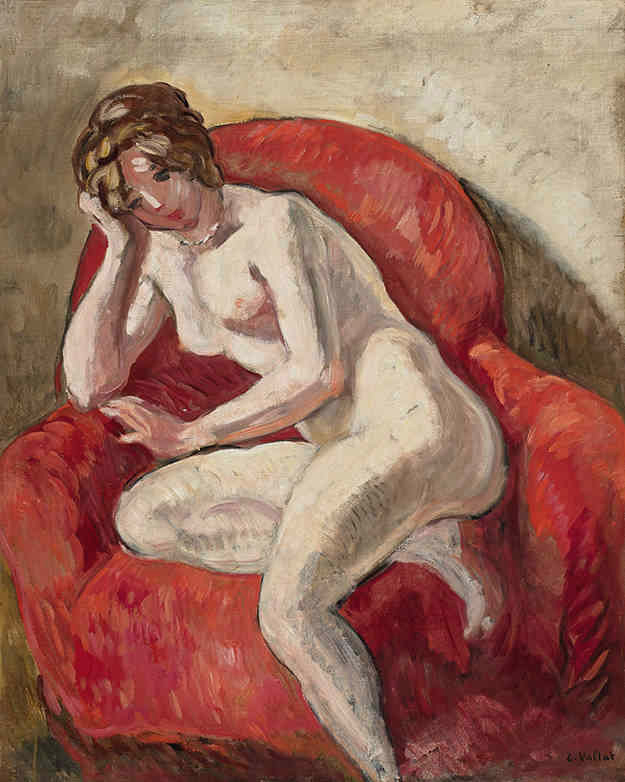
Louis Valtat, 1913, Nu au fauteuil (Nu sur fond rose), oil on canvas, 81.4 × 65.4 cm, private collection. Exposició d'Art francès d'Avantguarda, Galeries Dalmau, Barcelona, 1920

Jean Metzinger, c. 1917, Nature morte, Exposició d'Art francès d'Avantguarda, Galeries Dalmau, Barcelona, 1920 (page from catalogue)

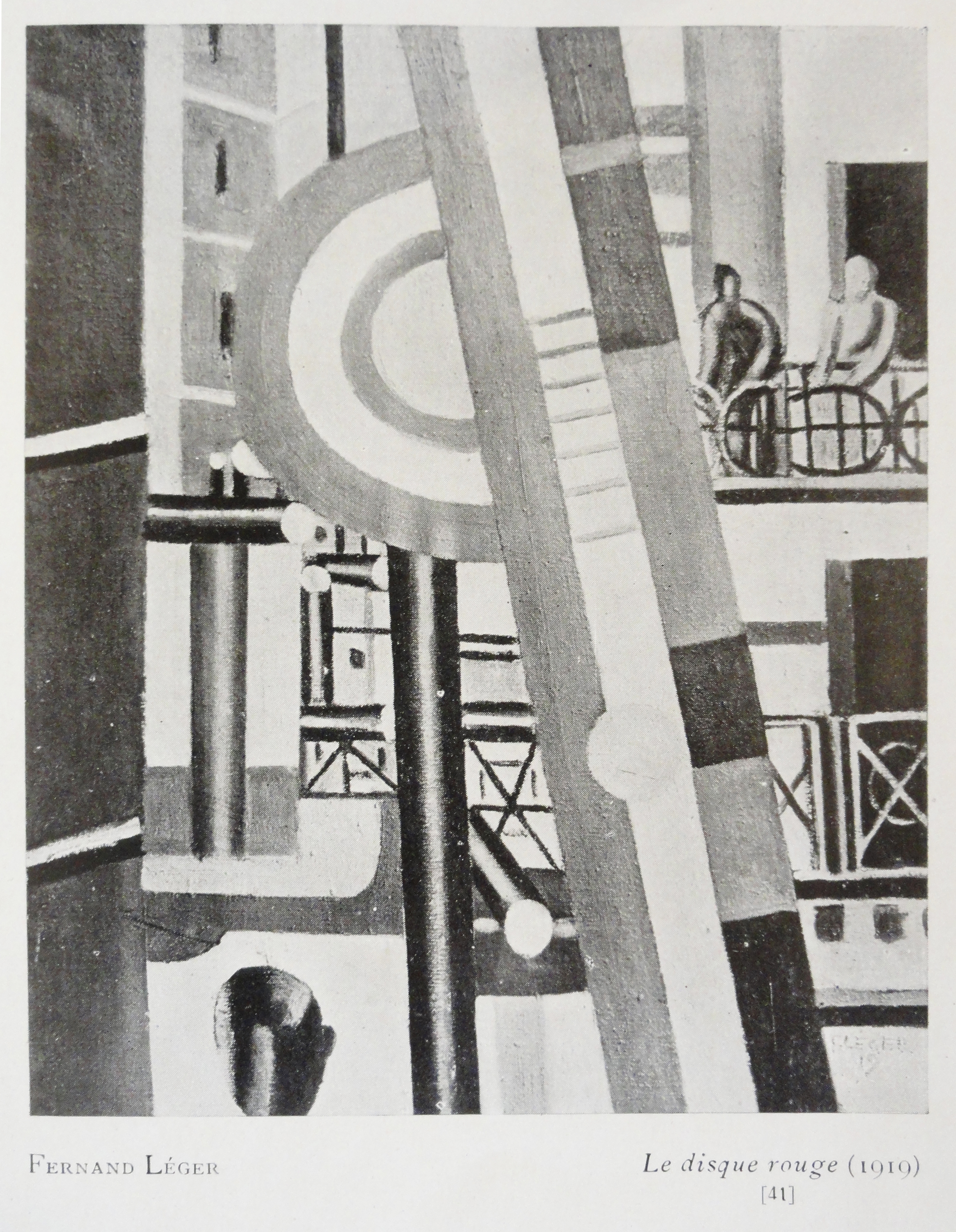
Fernand Léger, 1919, Le disque rouge, Exposició d'Art francès d'Avantguarda, Galeries Dalmau, Barcelona, 1920 (catalogue page)

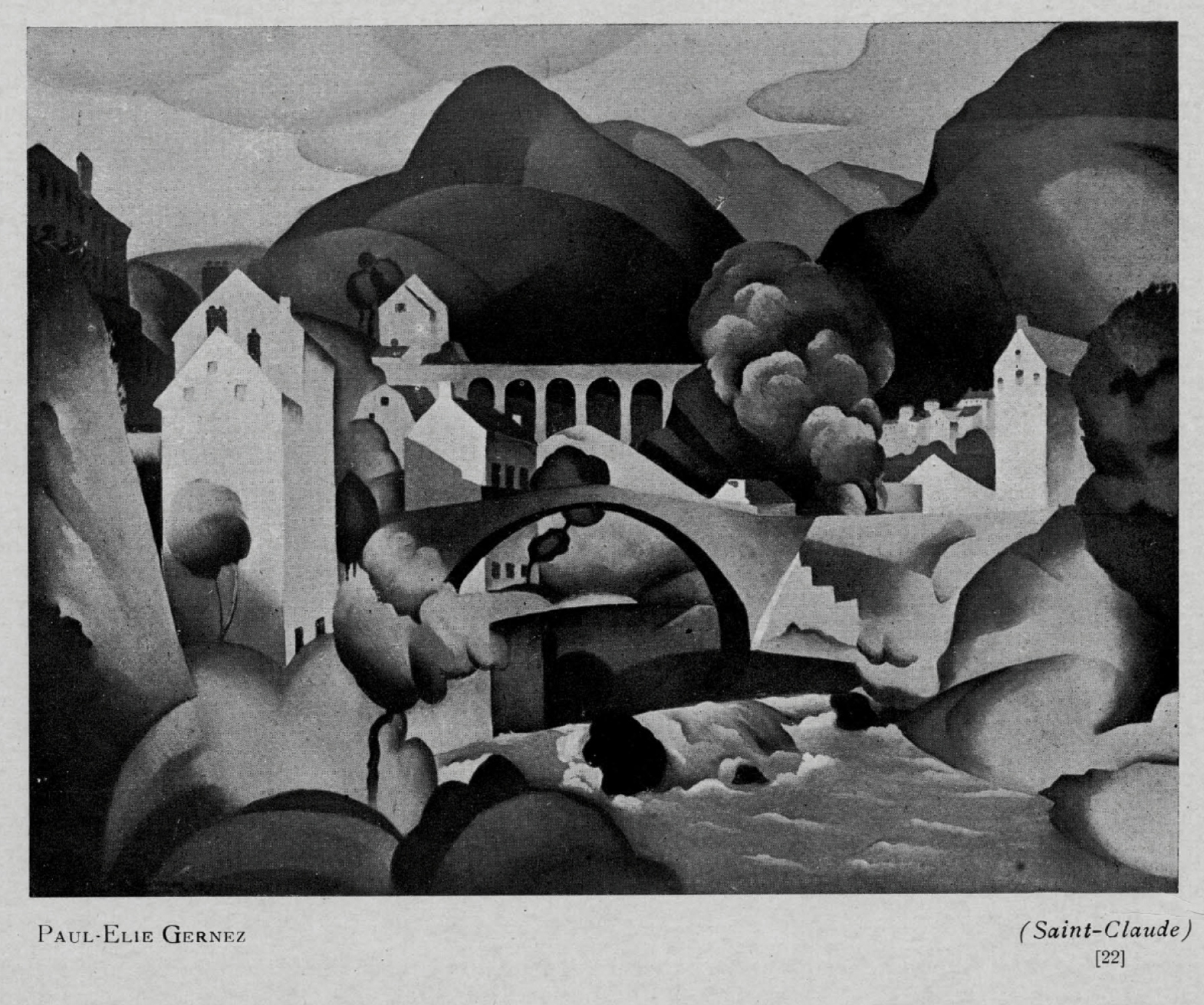
Paul-Élie Gernez, Saint-Claude, Exposició d'Art francès d'Avantguarda, Galeries Dalmau, Barcelona, 1920 (catalogue)

Joaquim Sunyer, c. 1920, La sandía (The Watermelon), oil on canvas, 59 × 71.5 cm, Museu Nacional d'Art de Catalunya, Exposició d'Art francès d'Avantguarda, Galeries Dalmau, Barcelona, 1920

==== 1922: Francis Picabia ====
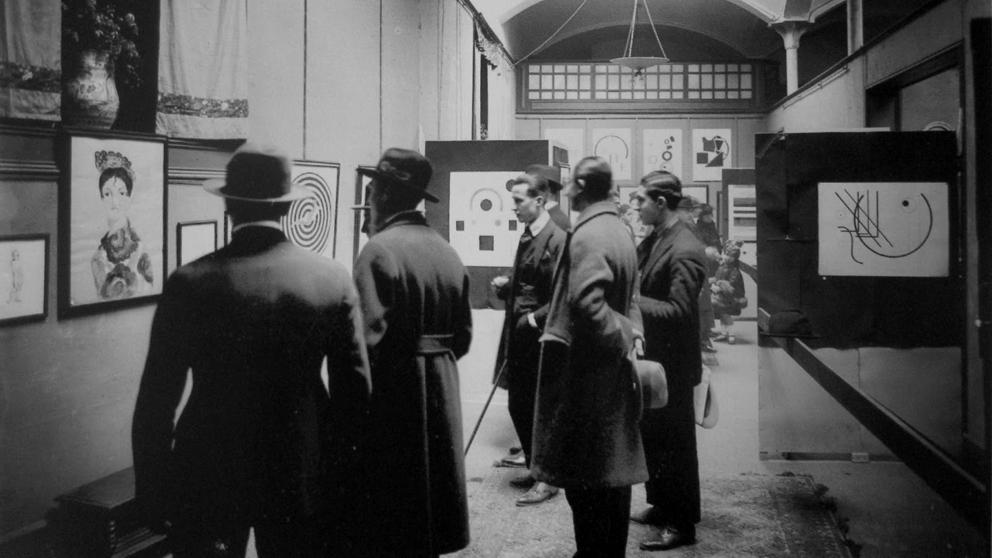
Francis Picabia exhibition opening, Galeries Dalmau, Barcelona, 18 November 1922

Francis Picabia presented his first and only solo exhibition in Barcelona at the Galleries Dalmau, from 18 November to 8 December 1922. Picabia, by this time, had already transited through a Cubist phase (in Paris) and a proto-Dada phase (New York City). Picabia exhibited forty-seven works at the Galeries Dalmau, all recent (produced within months of the show) and previously unpublished. The works were an eclectic mix of figurative art, abstract and mechanical representations ("late machinist"). This was a transition period between Dada and Surrealism. The subjects of the work included was reflected in the titles: Aviation, Astrolab, Thermometer for the blind, Spanish Woman and Optophone. Before the opening, a lecture on modern art was delivered at the Ateneu Barcelonès by André Breton, who once wrote that "Paris is bigger than Picabia, but Picabia is the capital of Paris." He also wrote the preface published in the catalogue for the occasion:

"... Indeed, the work no longer resides in the more or less successful combination of colors, in the game of lines that approaches more or less high degree the reality. There is no similarity, not even distant. The joke of representation has lasted too long ... giving way to compositions where the plastic values, exempt of all representative or symbolic intent, may not play as significant a role as the signature or title. ... "

The negative reviews from the Catalan cultural and artistic institutions following the first publications of 391, appeared to have interfered in Picabia's exhibition at Dalmau, despite the fact that tendencies were flowing inexorably toward the avant-garde, Dada included. Neither André Breton's conference or the exhibition catalog were particularly successful. However, there was published an extensive article on Picabia and Breton's conference in La publicitat, written by the art critic Magí Albert Cassanyes i Mestre.

To his credit, writes Elisenda Andrés Pàmies, since 1912 Josep Dalmau had been the first and only Catalan dealer to have established relationships with the creators of the diaspora and welcomed them into Les Galleries Dalmau. Picabia's exhibition solidified that continuity.

Dalmau published the first four issues of the Dadaist review 391 (1917–1924) and Cinquante-deux miroirs (1914–1917) created by Picabia.

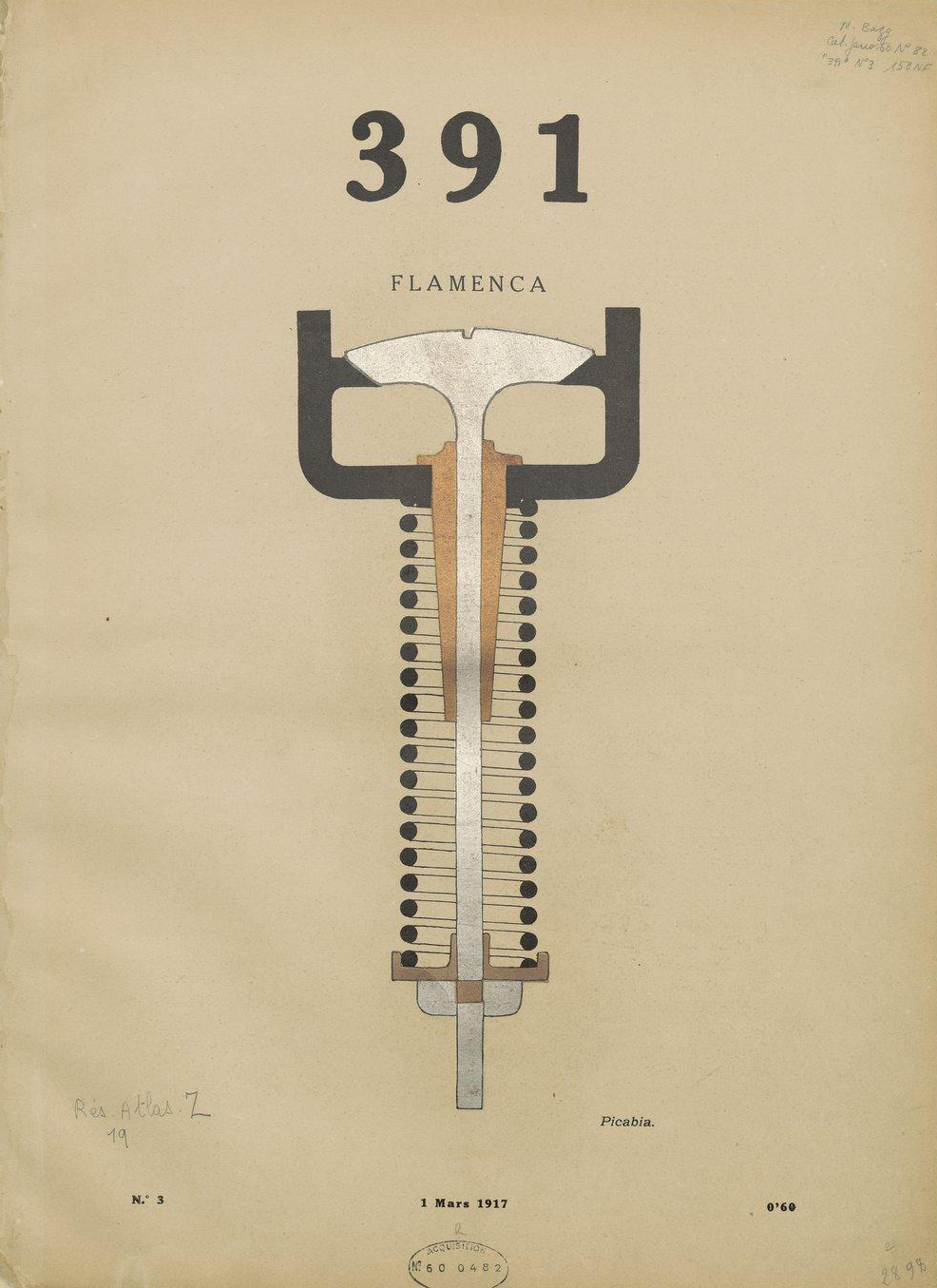
Francis Picabia, Flamenca, 391, n. 3, March 1, 1917

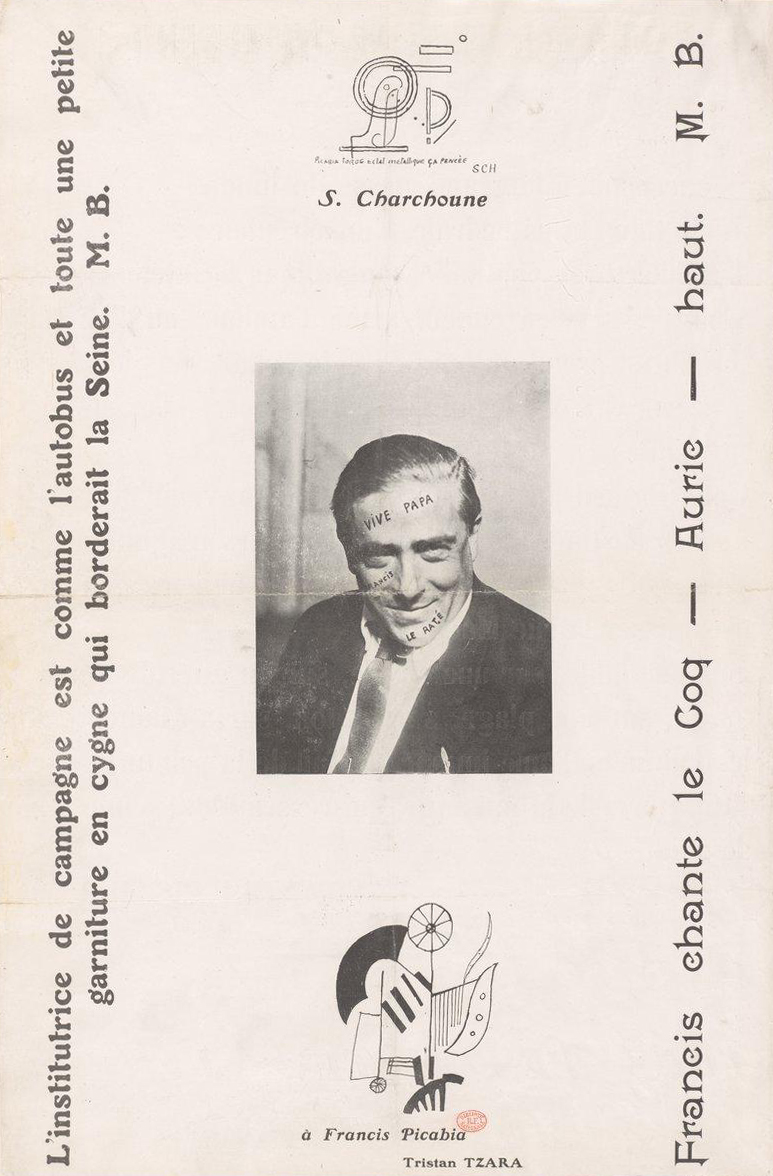
Francis Picabia, Francis chante le Coq, 391, n. 14, November 1920

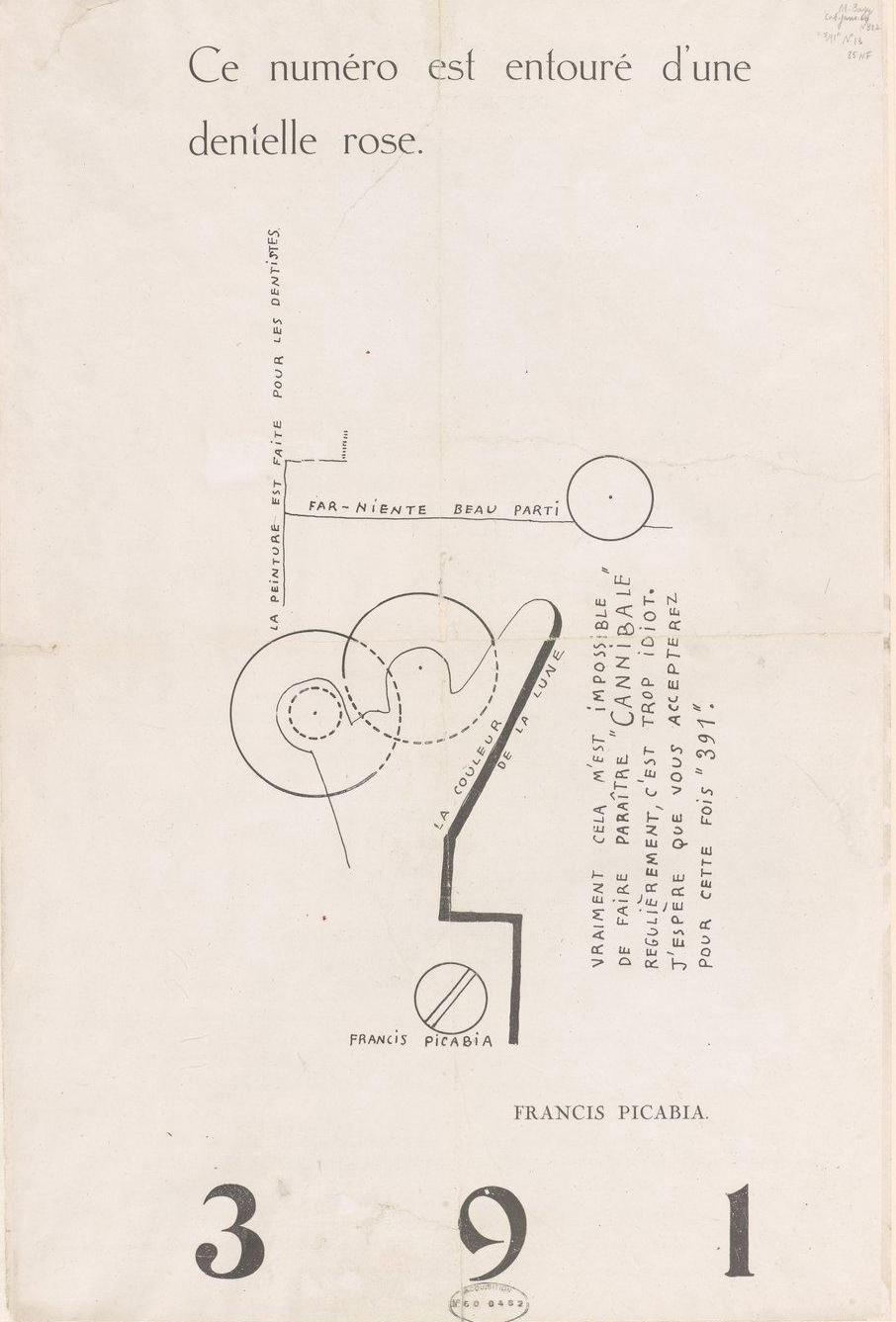
Francis Picabia, Ce numéro et entouré d'une deníelle rose. Page from 391, n. 13, July 1920

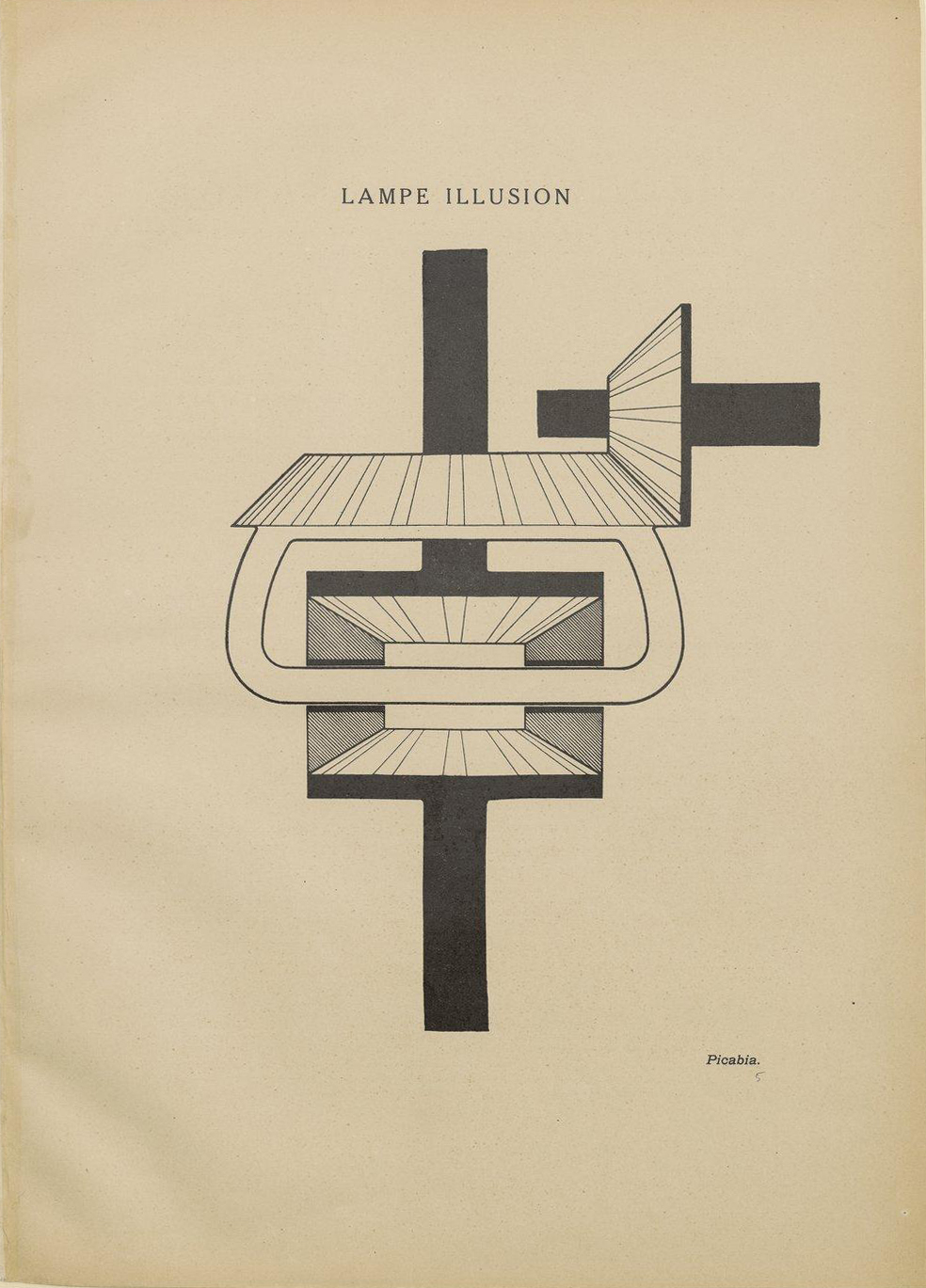
Francis Picabia, Lampe Illusion, 391, n. 3, March 1, 1917

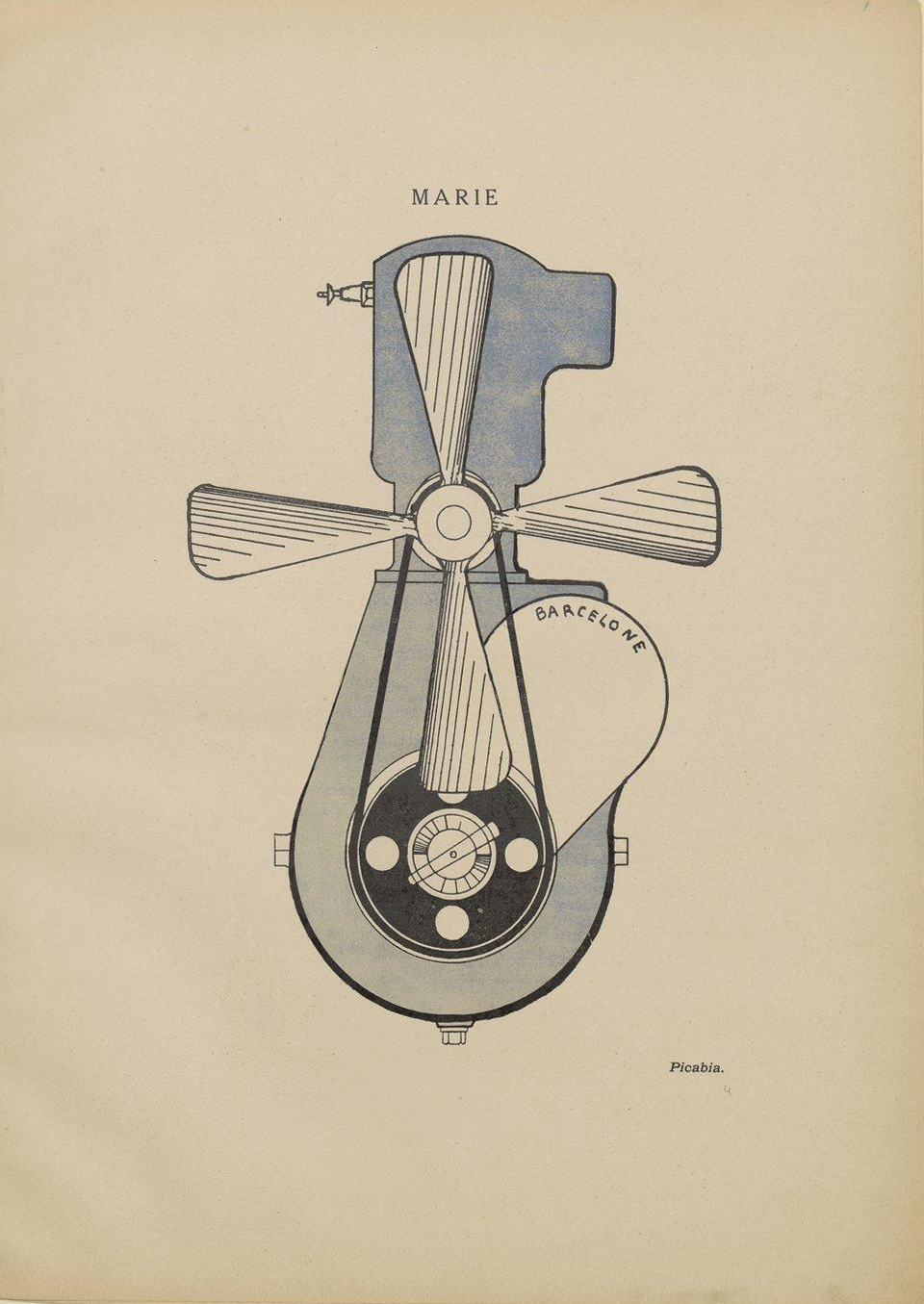
Francis Picabia, Marie, Barcelone, 391, n. 3, March 1, 1917

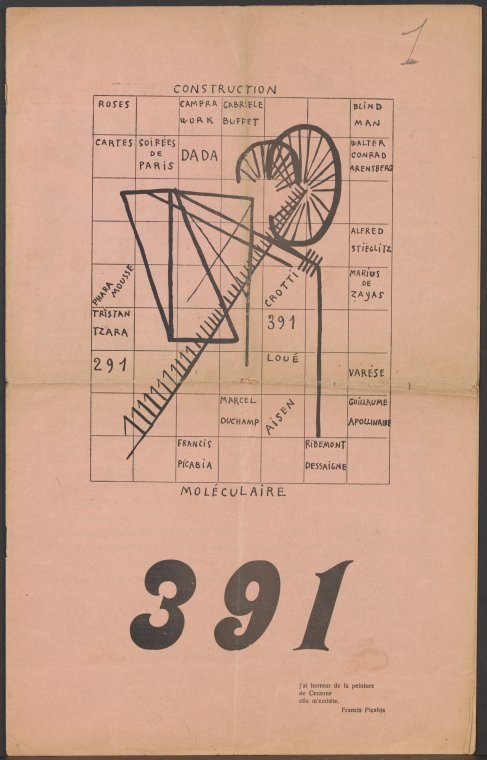
Francis Picabia, Molèculaire, 391, No. 8, February 1919

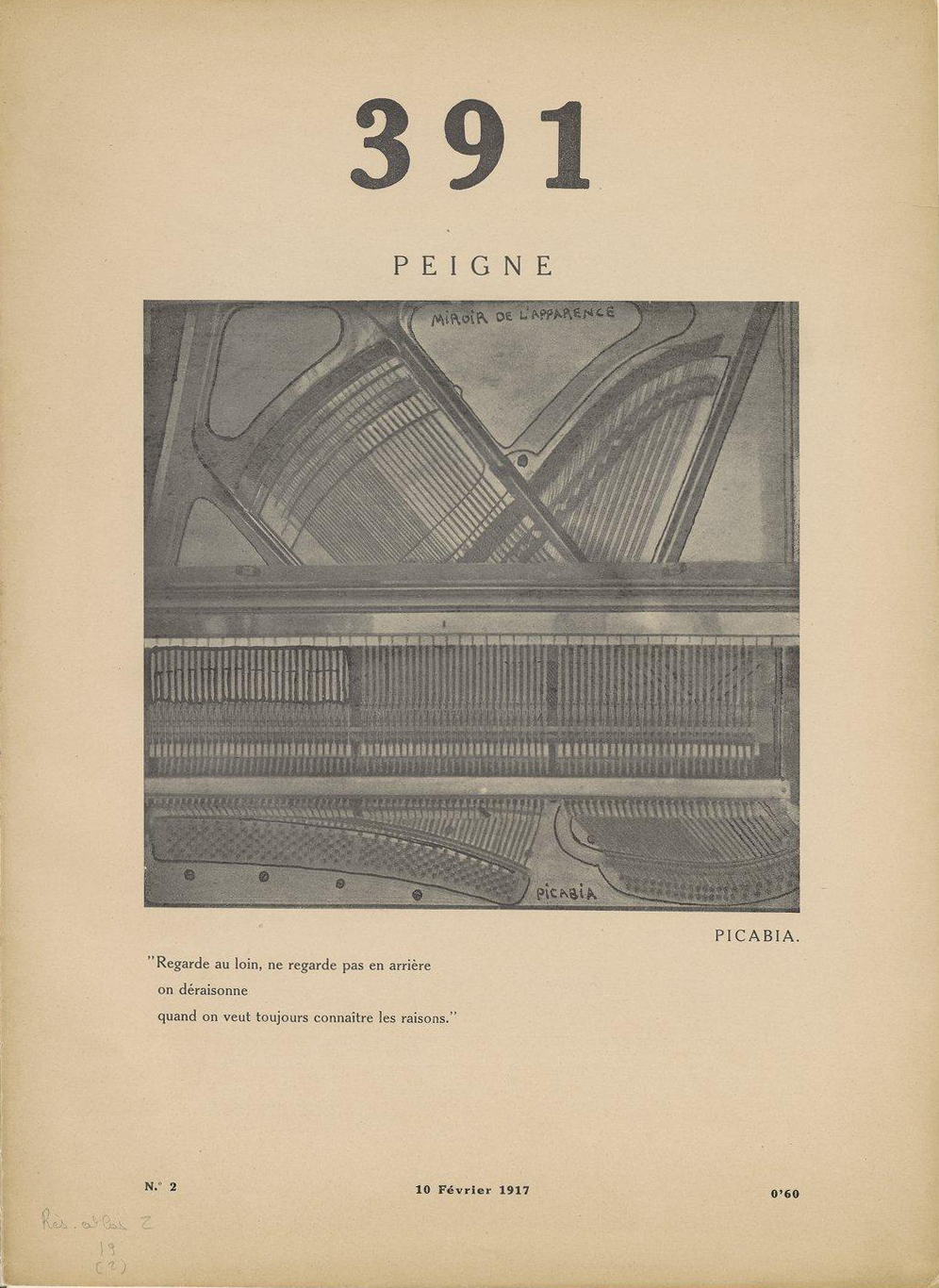
Francis Picabia, Peigne, Miroir de l'Apparence, 391, n. 2, February 10, 1917

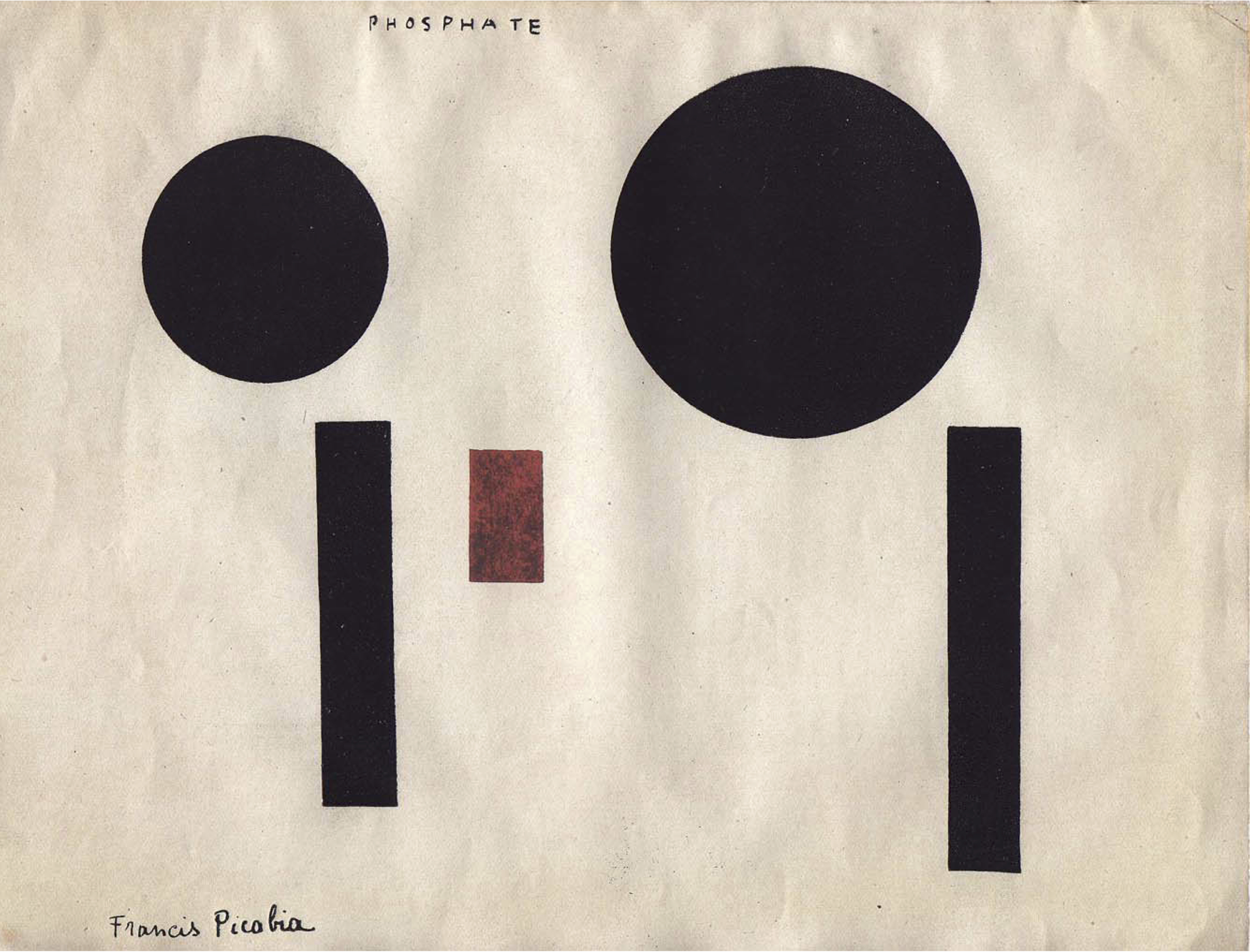
Francis Picabia, Phosphate, Littérature, No. 6, New Series, Paris, 1 November 1922

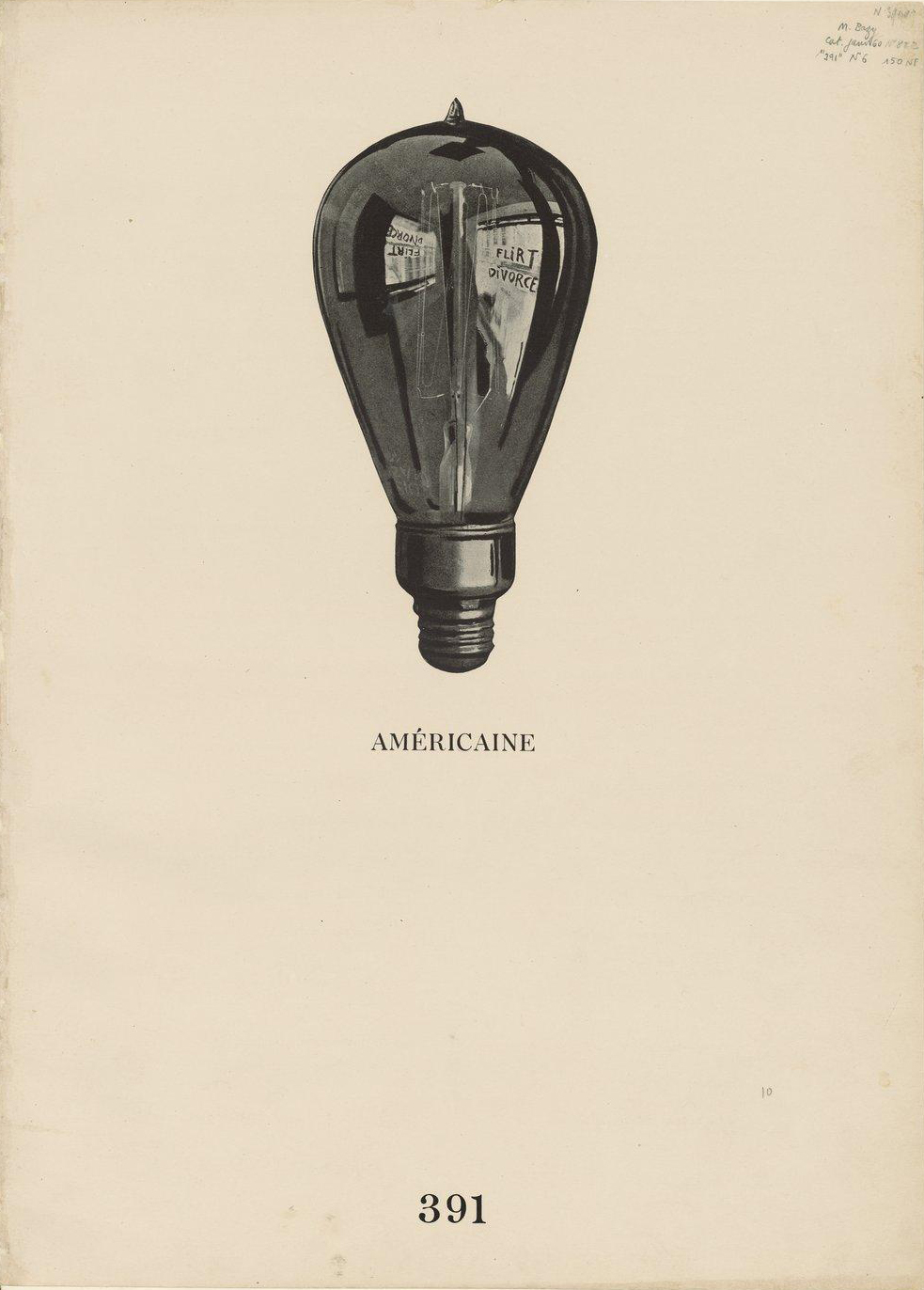
Francis Picabia, Américaine, 391, n. 6, July 1917

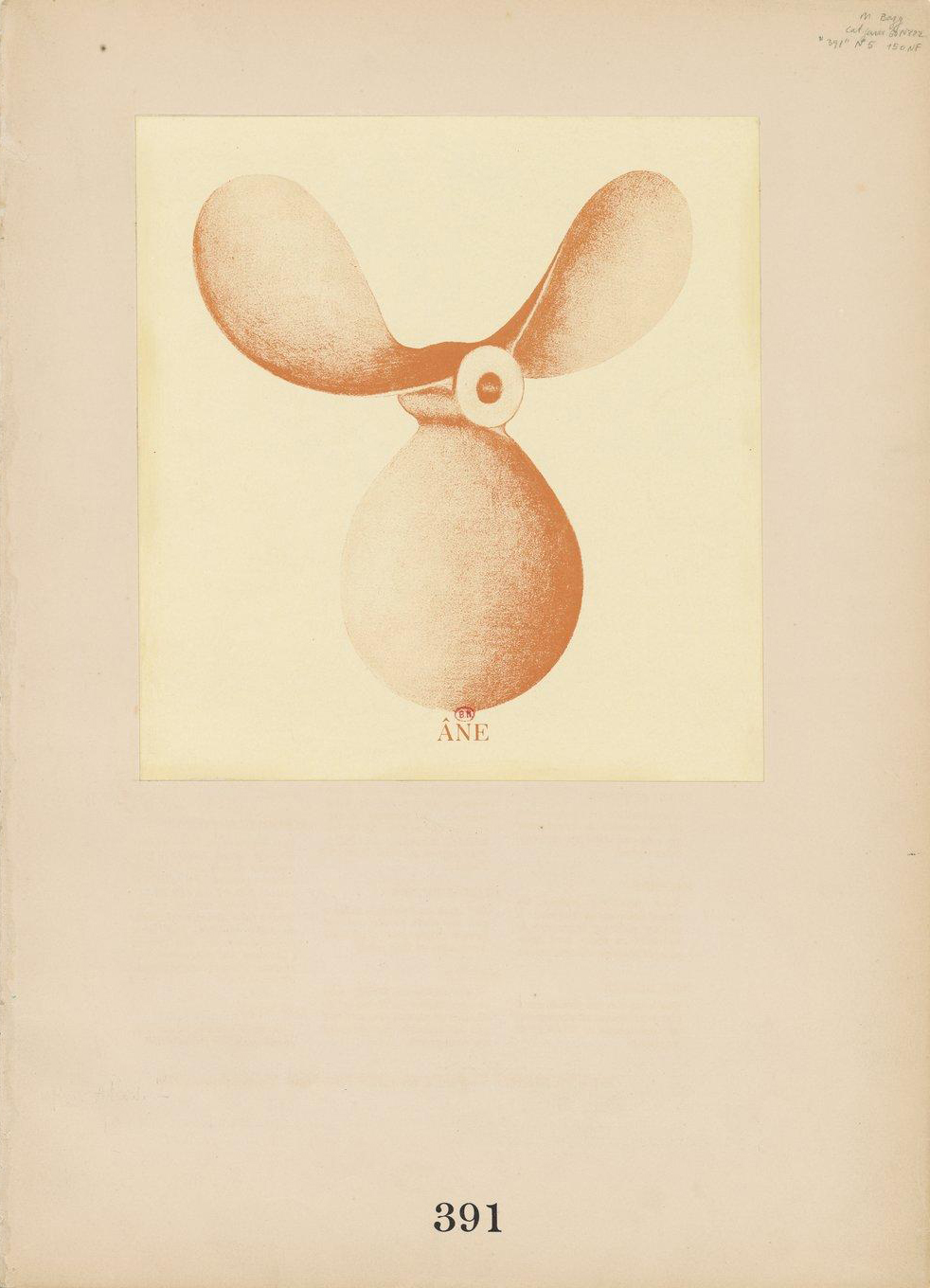
Francis Picabia, Âne (English: Donkey), 391, July 1917

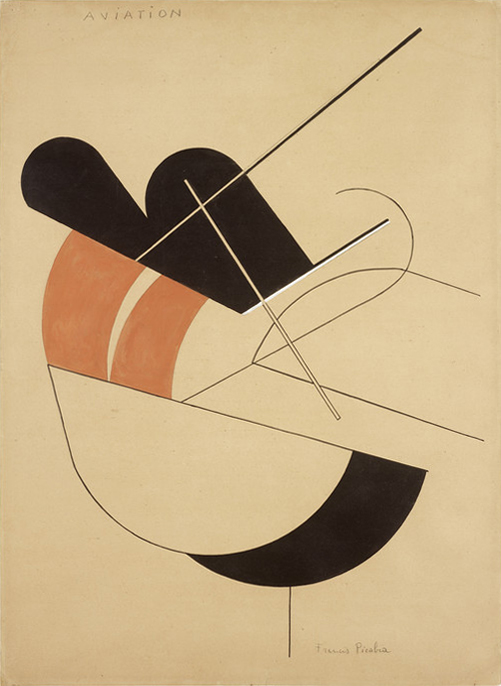
Francis Picabia, 1922, Aviation, ink, crayon, watercolor on paper, 79.9 × 54 cm, RISD Museum

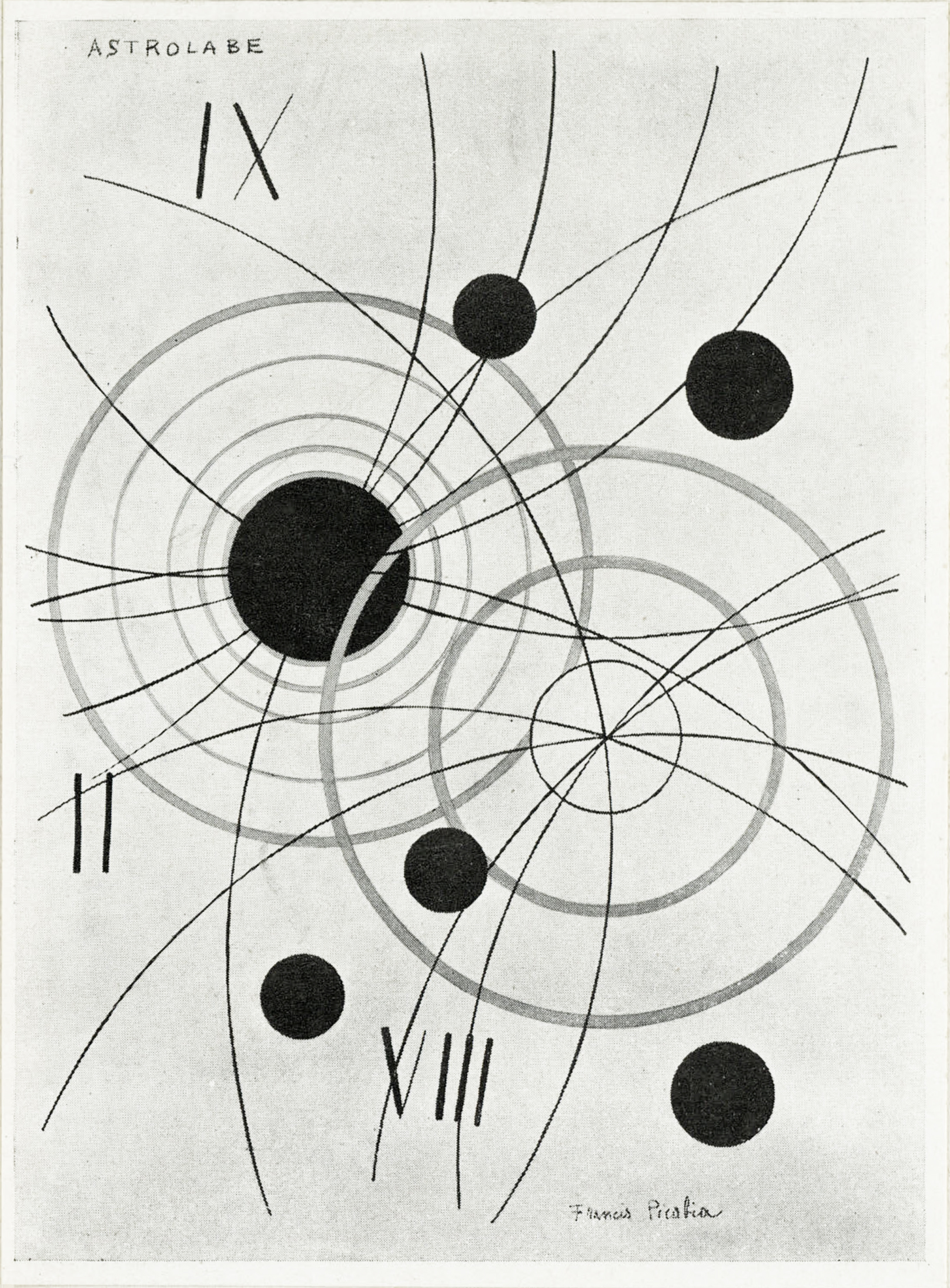
Francis Picabia, Astrolabe, Galeries Dalmau exhibition catalogue, 1922

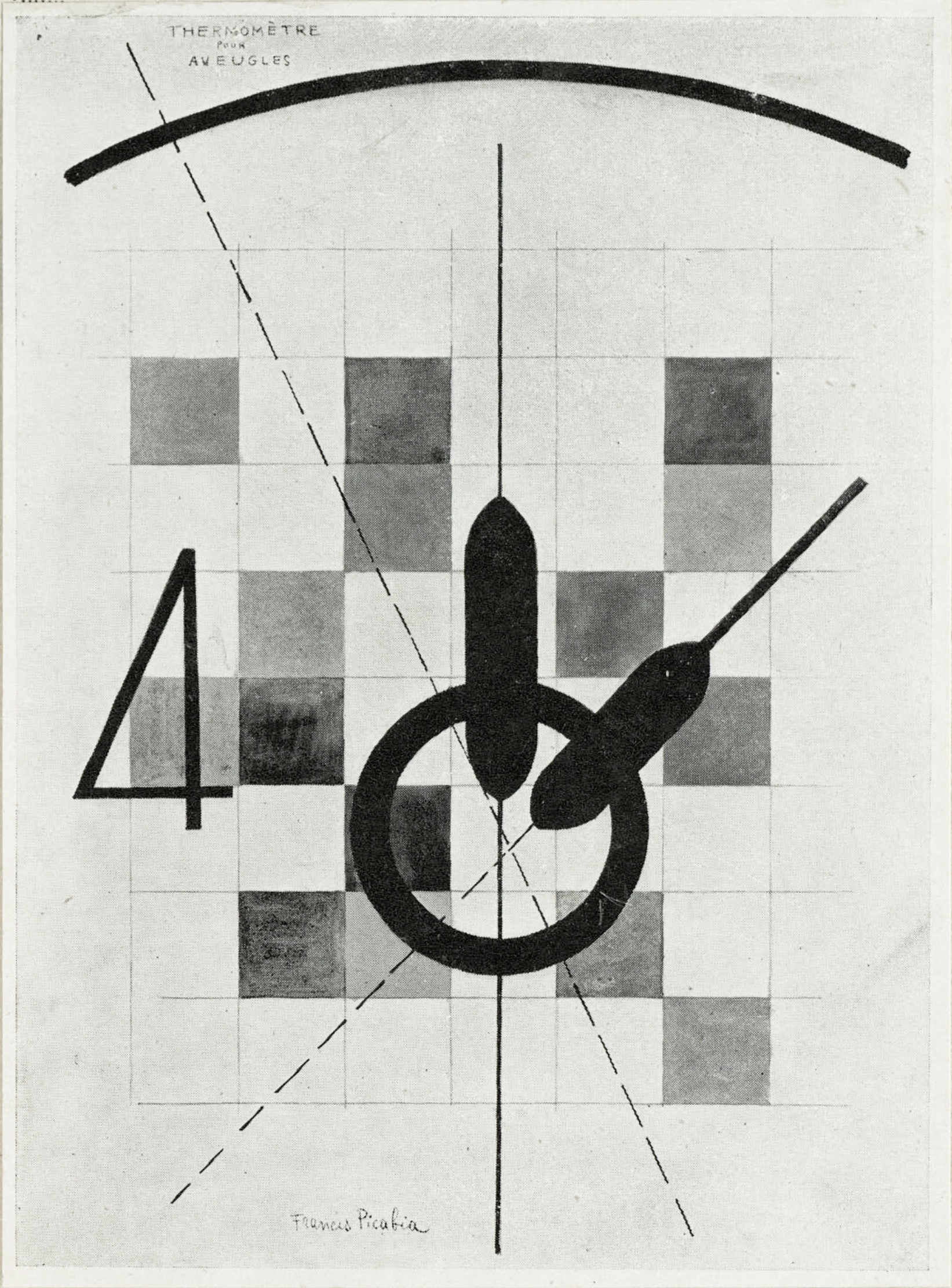
Francis Picabia, Thermomètre pour aveugles (Thermometer for the Blind), Galeries Dalmau exhibition catalogue 1922

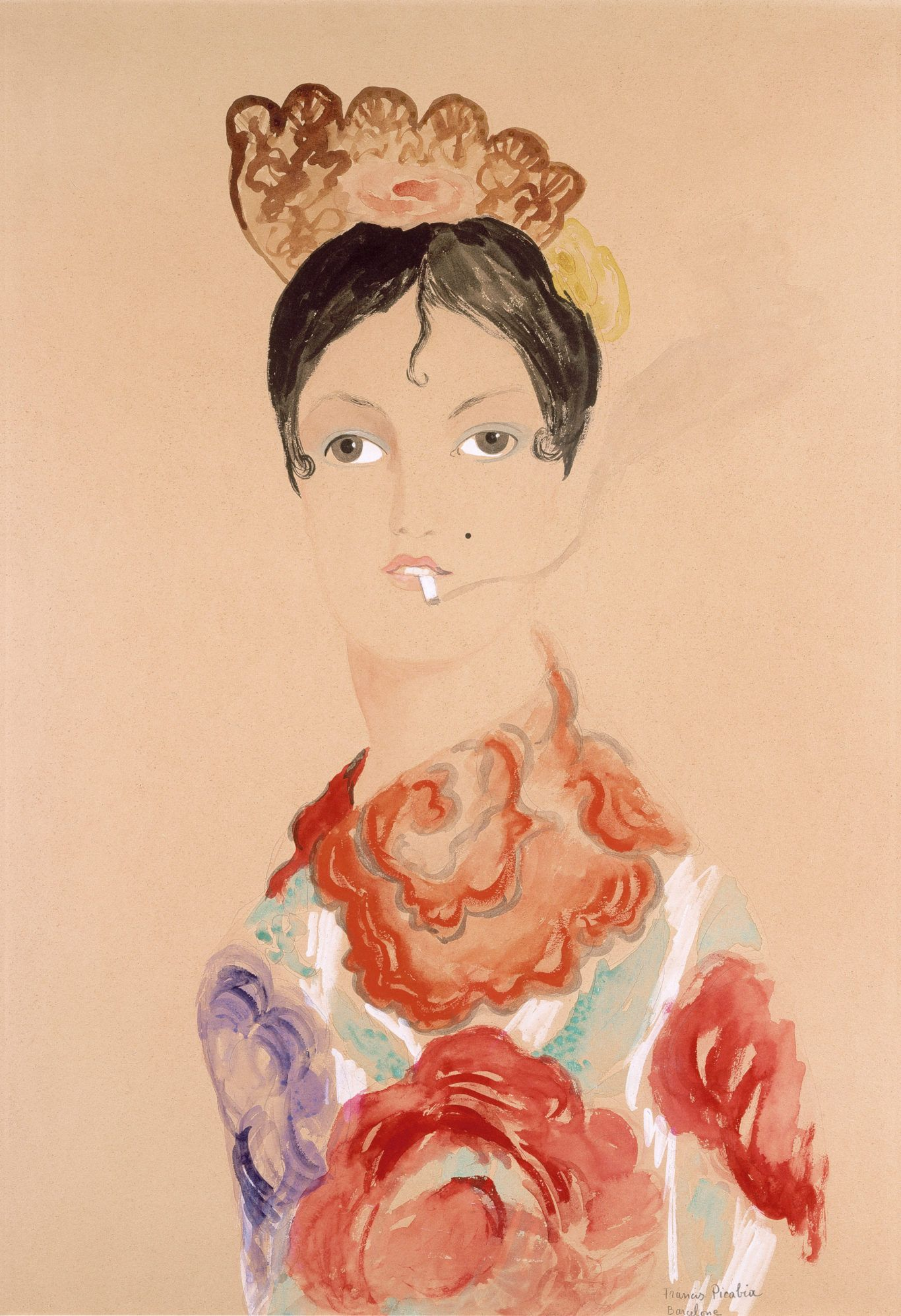
Francis Picabia, 1922, Femme Espagnole (Espagnole à la cigarette), watercolor, gouache and pencil on paper, 72 × 51 cm, private collection

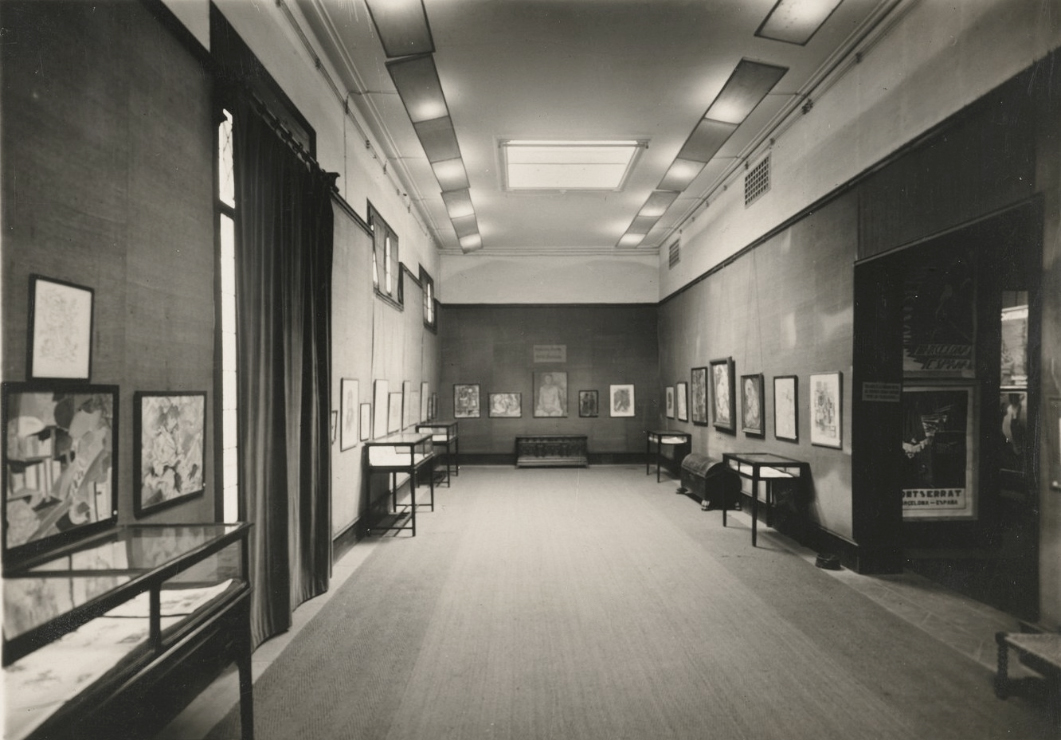
Galeries Dalmau, during an exhibition of Rafael Barradas, Passeig de Gràcia, Barcelona, 1925–26

==== 1923: Passeig de Gràcia ====
In 1923 the gallery relocated to one of the major avenues in Barcelona, Passeig de Gràcia, 62, where is remained until 1930, when the gallery would close permanently.

==== 1925–1927: Salvador Dalí ====
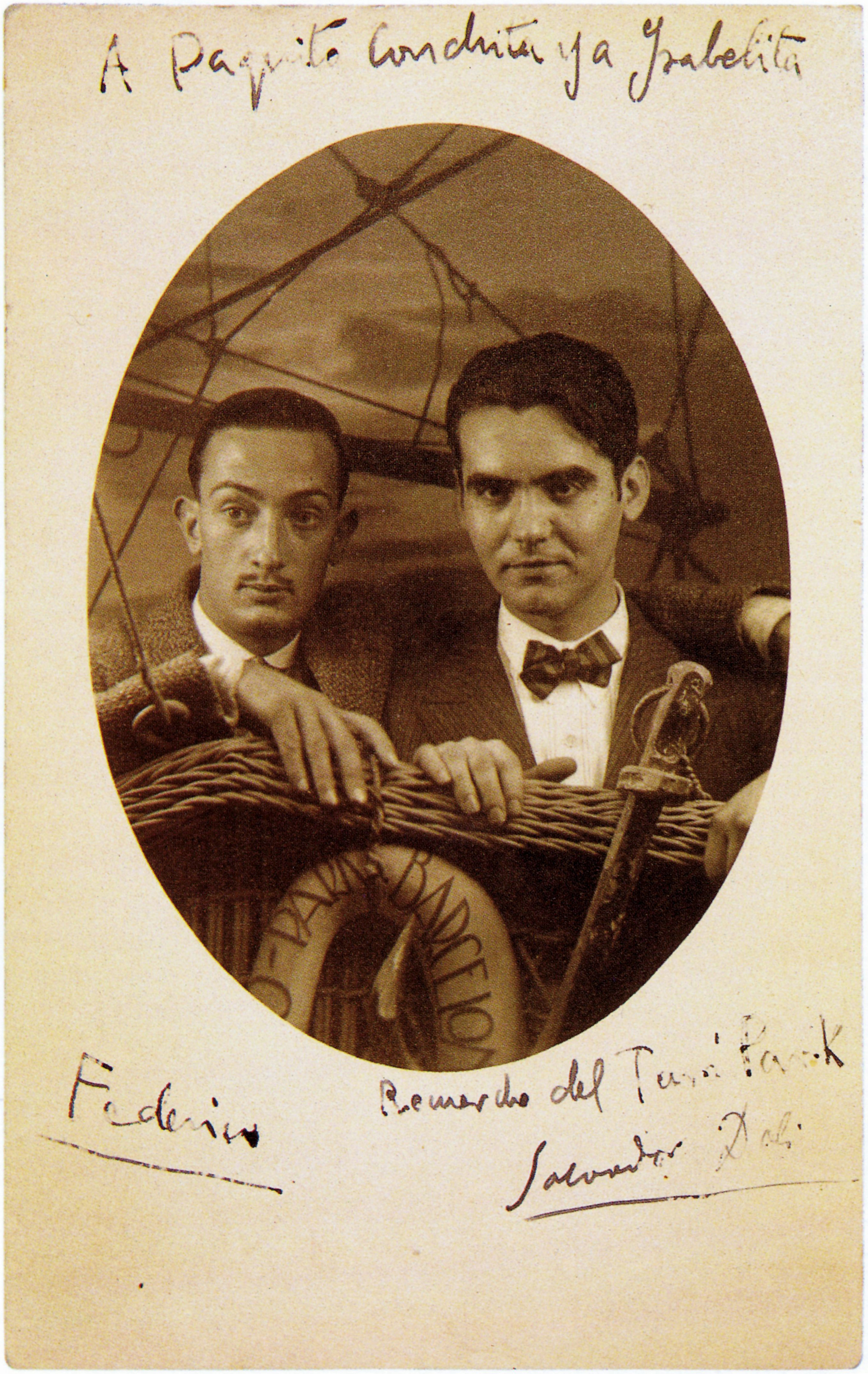
Salvador Dalí and Federico García Lorca, Turó Park de la Guineueta, Barcelona, 1925

The exhibition of Salvador Dalí, from 14 to 27 November 1925, was the artists first solo exhibition. At the time Dalí was not yet immersed in the surrealist style for which he would later become famous. The exhibition among the public and critics was well received. The following year he exhibited again at Dalmau, 31 December 1926 to 14 January 1927, with support of the art critic Sebastià Gasch.

During the mid-1920s, the gallery scene in Barcelona was very sophisticated, organized and complex. Dalmau was faced with competition in 1925 when the Maragall brothers—Joan-Antoni Maragall, youngest son of the poet Joan Maragall, and Raimon Maragall—purchased the gallery Sala Parés, joining the world of galleries and energizing the market. Sala Parés became a rival of Galeries Dalmau, since it attracted an important branch of artists (Modernism and Noucentisme), formerly promoted by Dalmau and Galeries Laietanes (founded in 1915).

==== 1926: Exposició de Modernisme Pictòric Català ====
This exhibition included a group of Catalan artist, and a group of European artists. Josep Dalmau exhibited three of his own works, along with Miró, Dalí, Torres-García, Sunyer, Junyer, Mompou, Cassanyes, and others. Also present were the works by Gleizes, Laurencin, Picabia, Weber, Vlaminck, Dufy, Delaunay, and Grunoff.

==== 1927: Federico García Lorca ====
Josep Dalmau, Salvador Dalí, J. V. Foix, Josep Carbonell, M. A. Cassanyes, Lluís Góneora, R. Saínz de la Maza Lluís Montanyà, Rafael Barradas, and J. Gutiérrez Gílí-Sebastià Gasch invited Federico García Lorca to exhibit drawing at the Galeries Dalmau, from 25 June – 2 July 1927.

Lorca's works were a blend of popular and avant-garde styles, complementing the artists poetry collection, "Canción" (Song), which was printed a month prior to the exhibition. Both his poetry and drawings reflected the influence of traditional Andalusian motifs, Cubism, and a preoccupation with sexual identity. Several drawings consisted of superimposed dreamlike faces (or shadows). He later described the double faces as self-portraits, showing "man's capacity for crying as well as winning", inline with his conviction that sorrow and joy were inseparable, just as life and death.

In a sketch titled The Kiss, he drew a face much like his own, attached at the lips with another face, the profile of which resembled Dalí. Dalí had also drawn Lorca's face next to his own. Dalí later wrote of this period in his life as an artist, "for the duration of an eclipse", Lorca's shadow "came to darken the virginal originality of my spirit and of my flesh." Lorca too was consumed by Dalí, something visible in both his Cubist idiom and Surrealist syntax. The exhibition included a recognizable portrait of Dalí (cat. no. 14), part of a series Lorca had drawn at the time.

Lorca's exhibition attracted less attention than Dalí's, though there was some favorable press coverage, mainly by his friends, Dalí included. To Lorca's surprise, he did sell four drawings. Once the exhibition completed he gave the rest of the drawings to his friends.

==== 1929: Art Modern Nacional i Estranger ====
The Exhibition of Modern National and Foreign Art took place at Galeries Dalmau, Passeig de Gràcia, 31 October through 15 November 1929. Artists included Hans Arp, Sophie Taeuber-Arp, André Lhote, Piet Mondrian, Otto van Rees, Otto Weber, Theo van Doesburg, Otto Freundlich, Georges Vantongerloo, Jean Hélion, Gustavo Cochet, along with large contingent of Catalan artists.

Reviews included a lengthy exposé in La Gaceta Literaria by Sebastià Gasch, particularly on the Cubist aspect of the exhibition, and by Rafael Benet, under the pseudonym Baiarola, in La Veu de Catalunya.

==== 1930: Àngel Planells ====
Angel Planells was a surrealist painter. This was the artist's first solo exhibition.

== 1930: Gallery closes ==
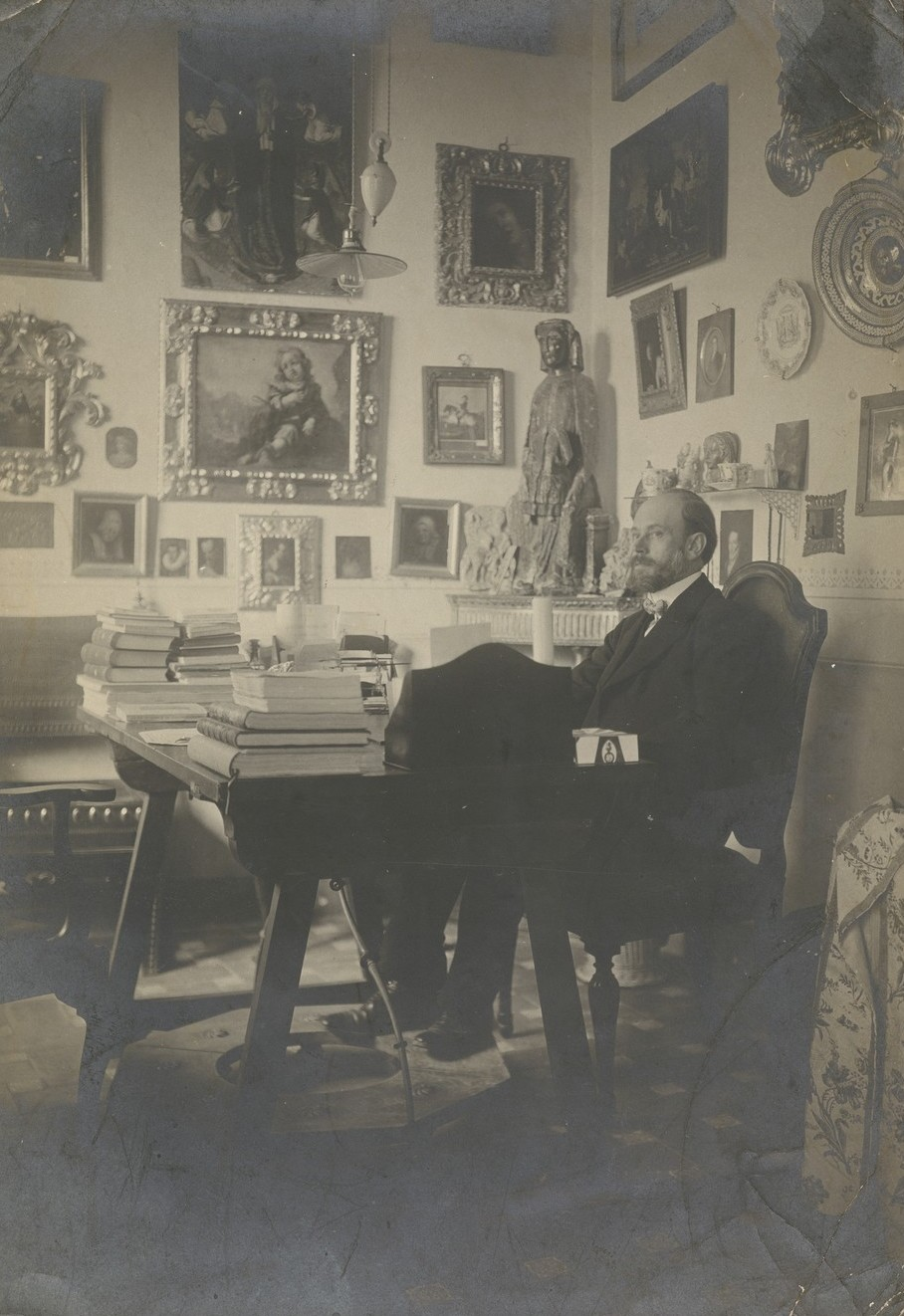
Josep Dalmau, in his office at the Galeries Dalmau, carrer Portaferrisa, 18, 1911–1923

The closing of Galeries Dalmau was possibly due to several factors: the use of operational procedures obsolete in the art market of the twenties, expenses, increasing competition, and the low profitability obtained from the sales. Sebastià Gasch, attributed the demise of Galeries Dalmau to the attitude of Josep Dalmau, "the almost absolute disappearance of that eagerness of selection that presided over his old galleries." He also pointed out, "Galleries Dalmau lost all their ingenuity when moving from the intensity of the Gothic Quarter of Barcelona—Portaferrissa—to the dilapidated Passeig de Gràcia."

In 1936, Dalmau became president of the Associació d'Artistes Independents and drafted its manifesto. He died the following year.

== Artists exhibited ==
- This list does not include Polish artists of the Exposició d'art polonès, 1912

Acín Aquilué, Ramón

Agero, August

Amat Pagès, Josep

Aragay, Josep

Aymat, Tomàs

Badrinas Escudé, Antoni

Ballesté, Jacint

Bardas, Nicolau Isidro

Barradas, Rafael

Basiana Arbiell, Evarist

Bechini, Gabriel

Begué, Hortense

Beltran Sanfeliu, Josep

Benet Vancells, Rafael

Bergnes, Guillem

Blanchard, María

Blanes, Camilo

Bosch Canals, Andreu

Boussingault, Jean-Louis

Braque, Georges

Bréton, André

Burty, Frank

Camarasa, F.

Camps, Francesc

Canals, Ricard

Cano, Manolo

Carles Rosich, Domingo

Cassanyes, Magí

Castanys, Valentí

Cénac Bercciartu, Enrique

Charchoune, Serge

Cid, Remigio

Clapés Puig, Aleix

Climent, Enrique

Cochet, Gustavo

Colom, Joan

Coscolla Plana, Feliu

Costa, Miquel

Costa, Pere

Cross, Henri-Edmond

Cueto, Germán

Dalí Domènech, Salvador

Dalmau Rafel, Josep

Dam, Bertil

De Regoyos, Darío

De Togores Llach, Josep

Delaunay, Sònia

Derain, André

Donskaia, Tatiana

Duchamp, Marcel

Dufy, Raoul

Dufy, Jean

Dunoyer de Segonzac, André

Dunyach Sala, Josep

Elias Bracons, Feliu

Enguiu Malaret, Ernest

Espinal Armengol, Marià

Estivill, Ricard

Fabrés, Júlia

Fernández Peña, Manuel

Ferrer, Agustí

Figueras, Llàtzer

Flores Garcia, Pedro

Friesz, Emile-Othon

Garay, Luis

García Lorca, Federico

García Maroto, Gabriel

Gausachs Armengol, Josep

Genover, Ignasi

Gérardin, Marthe-Antoine

Gernez, Paul-Élie

Gilberto, Lluís

Gimeno Arasa, Francesc

Gimeno, Martí

Gleizes, Albert

Gol, Josep Maria

Goller, Joseph

Gómez dela Serna, Ramón

Gómez, Helios

González Sevilla

Gosé Rovira, Xavier

Gottlieb, Leopold

Gris, Juan

Grunhoff, Helene

Guàrdia Esturí, Jaume

Guarro, Joan

Güell, Xavier

Gusef, Kallinic

Guyás, An

Hayden, Henri

Herbin, Auguste

Hermann-Paul, René Georges

Hoffmann, Robert

Homs Ferrés, Elvira

Humbert Esteve, Manel

Jack, Georges (?)

Jernàs, Elsa

Jönzen, Hadar

Jou, Lluís

Jujol, Josep Maria

Junyer, Joan

Kammerer, Ernst

Labarta, Francesc

Lagar, Celso

Lagut, Irène

Laprade, Pierre

Laurencin, Marie

Le Corbusier

Le Fauconnier, Henri

Léger, Fernand

Leyde, Kurt

Lhote, André

Lipchitz, Jacques

López Morella, Ramón

Losada, Manuel

Lotiron, Robert

Maeztu, Gustavo de

Malagarriga Ormat, Elvira

Manguin, Henri

Marchand, Jean

Marès, Frederic

Maristany de Trias, Luís

Marquès Puig, Josep Maria

Marquet, Albert

Matilla Marina, Segunda

Matisse, Henri

Mercadé, Lluís

Metzinger, Jean

Mimó, Claudi

Miret, Ramon

Miró, Joan

Mompou, Josep

Moreau, Luc-Albert

Moreno, Arturo

Moya Ketterer, José

Mutermilch, Mela

Natali, Renato

Nonell, Isidre

Obiols Palau, Josep

Olivé, Jacint

Ortiz de Zárate, Manuel

Öström, Folke

Palau Oller, Josep

Pascual Rodés, Ivo

Pascual Vicent, J.

Pérez Moro, Julio

Picabia, Francis

Picasso, Pablo

Pichot Gironès, Ramon

Planas, Pau

Planells Cruañas, Àngel

Portusach de Mascareñas, Josefina

Prat Ubach, Pere

Pretzfelder, Max

Pujó, Josep

Pujol Montané, Josep

Pujol Ripoll, Josep

Pujol, A. P.

Pujols, Francesc

R.de Pujulà, Germaine

Ràfols Fontanals, Josep Francesc

Ricart Nin, Enric Cristòfor

Rincón, Vicente

Rivera, Diego

Roqueta, Ramon

Roussel, Ker-Xavier

Ruiz, Diego

Rusiñol, Santiago

Ruth Cahn, Fräulein

Sermaise Perillard, Louis

Severini, Gino

Soucek, Slavi

Store, Emili

Sucre, Josep Maria del

Sunyer, Joaquím

Survage, Léopold

Timm, Ernest

Torné Esquius, Pere

Torné, Trinitat

Torres García, Joaquim

Traz, Georges de

Valtat, Louis

Vallotton, Félix

Vaño

Van Dongen, Kees

Van Rees, Otto

Velásquez Cueto, Lola

Vèrgez, Eduard

Vila Pujol, Joan

Vilà, Salvador

Villà Bassols, Miquel

Violet, Gustave

Vives, Mario

Vlaminck, Maurice

Weber, Otto

Xarraga, Angel

Ysern Alié, Pere
