= Nature morte (Metzinger) =

Painting by Jean Metzinger

- Artist: Jean Metzinger
- Year: c. 1911
- Medium: Oil on canvas
- Dimensions: 93.5 cm × 66.5 cm (36.8 in × 26.2 in)
- Location: Private collection

Nature morte (Still Life), or Compotier et cruche décorée de cerfs, is a Cubist painting by the French artist Jean Metzinger. It was exhibited at Exposició d'Art Cubista, Galeries Dalmau, Barcelona, 20 April – 10 May 1912 (no. 44). During this show—the first exhibition of Cubism in Spain—Metzinger's painting became one of the preferred targets of the press. It was exhibited again 1 – 15 April 1917 at Nya Konstgalleriet (The New Art Gallery) founded by the Italian Futurist Arturo Ciacelli in Stockholm (reproduced in the catalogue). Nya Konstgalleriet was one of the three main galleries in Sweden responsible for promoting national and international modernism between 1915 and 1925. The painting would eventually be exhibited at Galerie Philippe Reichenbach, Houston, where it was acquired in 1960. In 2008 Nature morte was auctioned at Sotheby's in New York.

== Description ==
Jean Metzinger, c.1911, Nature morte (Compotier et cruche décorée de cerfs); Juan Gris, 1911, Study for Man in a Café; Marie Laurencin, c.1911, Testa ab plechs; August Agero, sculpture, Bust; Juan Gris, 1912, Guitar and Glasses, or Banjo and Glasses. Published in Veu de Catalunya, 25 April 1912

Nature morte, signed "JMetzinger" (lower right), is an oil painting on canvas with dimensions 93.5 x 66.5 cm (36 3/4 by 26 1/4 in.), representing a still life. It is an interior scene depicting various objects including a compotier filled with fruit, a carafe, pears, a cup, a vase of flowers, and a jug (cruche) decorated with dear (cerfs). The objects are placed on a diamond-shaped table. In the 'background' (upper left) is another table with a glass and bowl resting on it.

The colors employed by the artist are typical of early Cubism, ranging from reds to earth tones and greens—a legacy of Paul Cézanne.

Rather than blurring the distinction between superimposed elements with irregular brushstrokes, Metzinger has clearly outlined each object with a thin dark line.

== Geometry ==
Jean Metzinger, Nature morte (Compotier et cruche décorée de cerfs), published in Nya Konstgalleriet, exhibition catalogue, 1–15 April 1917

The vertical composition is treated in a highly personal geometrically Cubist style with various planes, angles, layers and facets. The table upon which objects are placed is angled as if seen from above. The fruits, bowl, jug and other elements are depicted as if seen from a side view and from above simultaneously, giving an illusion of an overall flattening of the picture plain—a devise used by Cézanne, from which all of the Cubists drew inspiration. Cézanne's reduction of the visible world into fundamental shapes (cone, cube, sphere), the faceted reconstruction of nature through purely painterly forms, the fracture and flattening of space, are all present in Metzinger's picture. However, where the dialectic nature of Cézanne's work had been greatly influential during the highly expressionistic phase of proto-Cubism, between 1908 and 1910, the work of Georges Seurat, with its flatter, more linear structures, would capture the attention of Metzinger from early 1911.

"With the advent of monochromatic Cubism in 1910-1911," writes art historian Robert Herbert, "questions of form displaced color in the artists' attention, and for these Seurat was more relevant. Thanks to several exhibitions, his paintings and drawings were easily seen in Paris, and reproductions of his major compositions circulated widely among the Cubists. The Chahut [Rijksmuseum Kröller-Müller, Otterlo] was called by André Salmon "one of the great icons of the new devotion", and both it and the Cirque (Circus), Musée d'Orsay, Paris, according to Guillaume Apollinaire, "almost belong to Synthetic Cubism".

Paintings by Albert Gleizes, 1910–11, Paysage, Landscape; Juan Gris (drawing); Jean Metzinger, c.1911, Nature morte, Compotier et cruche décorée de cerfs. Published on the front page of El Correo Catalán, 25 April 1912

The concept was well established among the French avant-garde that painting could be expressed mathematically, in terms of both color and form. This mathematical expression resulted in an independent and compelling 'objective truth,' perhaps more so than the objective truth of the object represented. Indeed, the Neo-Impressionists had succeeded in establishing an objective scientific basis in the domain of color (Seurat addresses these problems in Circus and Dancers). Soon, the Cubists were to do so in both the domain of form and dynamics (Orphism) would later do so with color too.

Jean Metzinger, 1911–1912, La Femme au Cheval (Woman with a horse), oil on canvas, 162 x 130 cm, Statens Museum for Kunst, National Gallery of Denmark. Published in Apollinaire's 1913 Les Peintres Cubistes, Exhibited at the 1912 Salon des Indépendants. Provenance: Jacques Nayral, Niels Bohr

Metzinger played a crucial role in the establishment of the Cubist movement, on both artistic and theoretical levels (organizing and exhibiting at the first public manifestations of Cubism at the 1910 and 1911 Salons; and publishing a series of writings in well-established literary journals defining and defending Cubism. Metzinger was the first to write that four artists had dismissed traditional perspective and felt free to move around their subjects, studying them from various points. In this seminal work, he compares the similarities between the paintings of Pablo Picasso, Georges Braque, Robert Delaunay, Albert Gleizes and Henri Le Fauconnier. In doing so he enunciated for the first time what would become known as the primary characteristics of Cubism: the notions of simultaneity and mobile perspective. In this 1910 text Metzinger stressed the distance between their works and traditional perspective. These artists, he wrote, granted themselves 'the liberty of moving around objects', and combining many different views in one image, each recording varying experiences over the course of time.

Jean Metzinger, 1910–11, Deux Nus (Two Nudes, Two Women), oil on canvas, 92 x 66 cm, Gothenburg Museum of Art, Sweden. Exhibited at the first Cubist manifestation, Room 41 of the 1911 Salon des Indépendants, Paris

Of this group, only Metzinger and Braque were familiar with the works of Picasso, and Metzinger alone, familiar with the works of everyone in the group. Metzinger was the first to recognize explicitly and implicitly the significance of the use of "a free, mobile perspective", and the "mixing... of the successive and the simultaneous".

Nature morte shows Metzinger's particular interest in the use of mathematics and geometry. In Du "Cubisme", written the following year, Metzinger and Gleizes proclaimed:

"To establish pictorial space, we must have recourse to tactile and motor sensations, indeed to all our faculties. It is our whole personality which, contracting or expanding, transforms the plane of the picture. As it reacts, this plane reflects the personality back upon the understanding of the spectator, and thus pictorial space is defined: a sensitive passage between two subjective spaces. The forms which are situated within this space spring from a dynamism which we profess to dominate. In order that our intelligence may possess it, let us first exercise our sensitivity. There are only nuances. Form appears endowed with properties identical to those of color. It is tempered or augmented by contact with another form, it is destroyed or it flowers, it is multiplied or it disappears".

While Nature morte "shows the artist's mastery of abstraction and geometry", writes Sotheby's in their Lot notes, "all of the compositional elements combine to create a remarkable evocation of the still-life subject". In this way, Nature morte achieves the artist's goals "of engaging with and enveloping the viewer".

== See also ==
- List of works by Jean Metzinger
