= Woman with a Hat (Metzinger) =

Painting by Jean Metzinger

- Femme au Chapeau (French)
- Artist: Jean Metzinger
- Year: c. 1906
- Medium: Oil on canvas
- Dimensions: 44.8 cm × 36.8 cm (17.6 in × 14.5 in)
- Location: Korban Art Foundation

Femme au Chapeau (French: Femme au Chapeau or Lucie au chapeau) is an oil painting by the French artist and theorist Jean Metzinger, created c. 1906. The work is executed in a highly personal Divisionist style with a marked Proto-Cubist component during the height of Fauvism. Femme au Chapeau exhibits a presentiment of Metzinger's subsequent interest in the faceting of form associated with Cubism. The painting is part of the collection of the Korban Art Foundation.

== Description ==
Femme au Chapeau is an oil painting on canvas with dimensions 44.8 x 36.8 cm (17 5/8 x 14½ in.), signed J.Metzinger (lower right). The work—executed in a style consistent with other works by Metzinger created between 1905 and 1907, such as Two Nudes in an Exotic Landscape—is a portrait of an elegant women, Metzinger's future wife, Lucie Soubiron, gazing self-assuredly directly at the spectator, wearing a fashionable wide-brimmed hat with a large green-bleu bow tied in a simple knot.

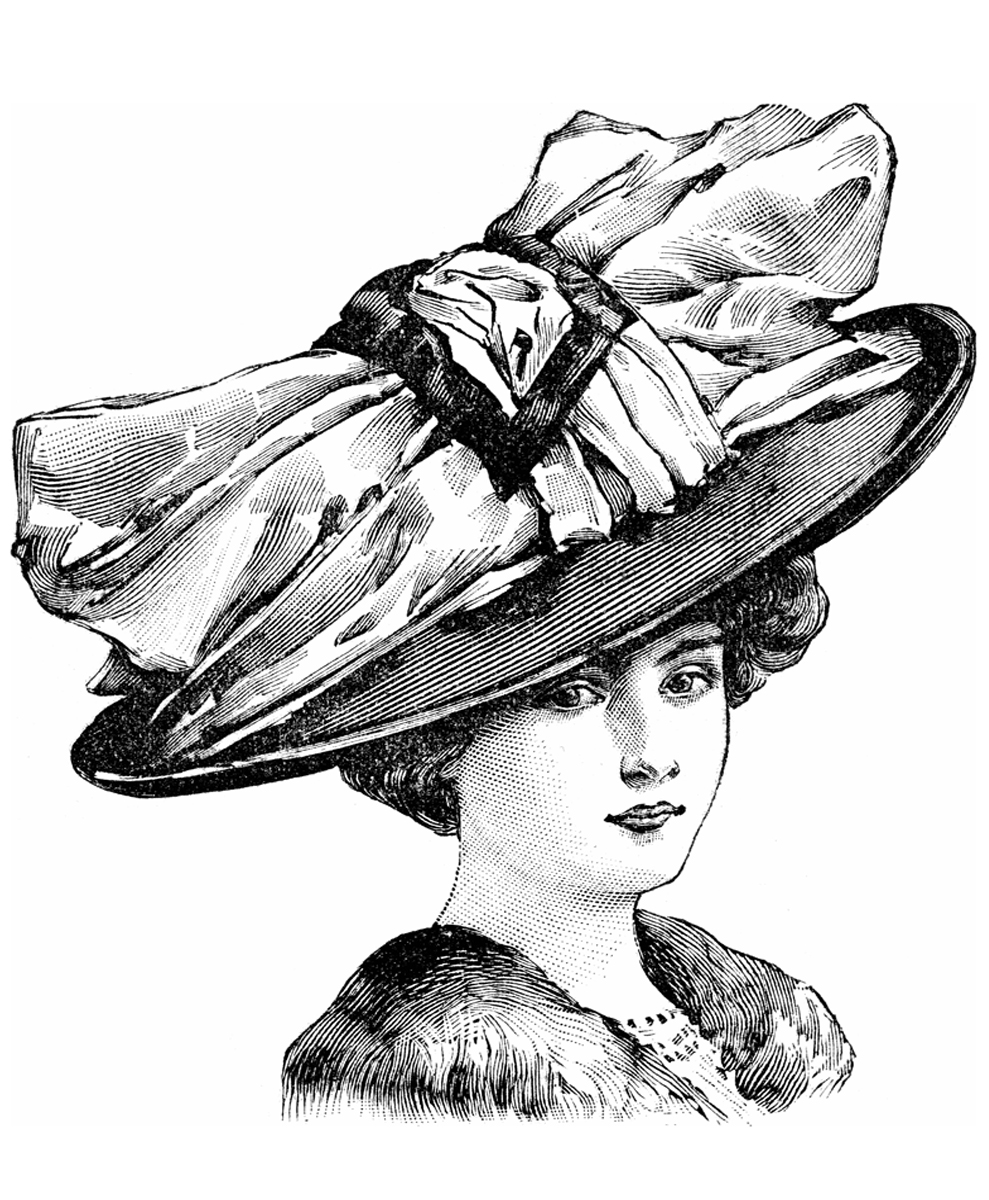
Chapeau tendu orné d'un grand nœud de taffetas, Grands magasin du Louvre Paris; Saison d'hiver 1911–12

Metzinger's use of color in Femme au Chapeau is very closely related to the works of artist directly in his entourage known as the Fauves; quasi-pure greens, blues and violets, juxtaposed in groups far from randomly. However, the composition contains a variety of geometrized shapes, including the actual brushstrokes, that distinguish this work from the Fauves.

While the face of the sitter is treated with natural colors, the rest of the canvas appears treated with more artificial tints, tones, hues and shades. Unlike other Fauve works of the same period by Henri Matisse, André Derain, Maurice de Vlaminck or Kees van Dongen, Metzinger's composition is strongly Cézannian. The vertical format and background structure creates a flattening of spatial perspective, reminiscent of Cézanne's 'multiple viewpoints', his search for order, discipline and permanence. However, the brushstrokes and overall appearance are not at all Cézannian or Fauve in nature.

== Mosaic-like 'cubes' ==
The art critic Louis Chassevent writing about the 1906 Salon des Indépendants used the word "cube" with reference to Jean Metzinger and Robert Delaunay, two and a half years before similar references would be made by Louis Vauxcelles to baptize the Proto-Cubist or Cubist works Pablo Picasso or Georges Braque. Recognizing the difference between Metzinger and his contemporaries Louis Chassevent wrote in 1906:

"M. Metzinger is a mosaicist like M. Signac but he brings more precision to the cutting of his cubes of color which appear to have been made mechanically." (Robert Herbert, 1968, Neo-Impressionism, The Solomon R. Guggenheim Foundation, New York)

The following year Metzinger and Delaunay shared an exhibition at Berthe Weill's gallery (1907). They were singled out by Louis Vauxcelles as Divisionists who used large, mosaic-like 'cubes' to construct small but highly symbolic compositions.

One and a half years later, November 1908, Vauxcelles, in his brief review of Georges Braque's exhibition at Kahnweiler's gallery, called Braque a daring man who despises form, "reducing everything, places and a figures and houses, to geometric schemas, to cubes.

Metzinger's work shown with a painting by Henri Matisse

Jean Metzinger, c. 1906, Femme au Chapeau (Woman with a Hat), oil on canvas, 44.8 x 36.8 cm, Korban Art Foundation

The size relation shown here may not reflect actual dimensions

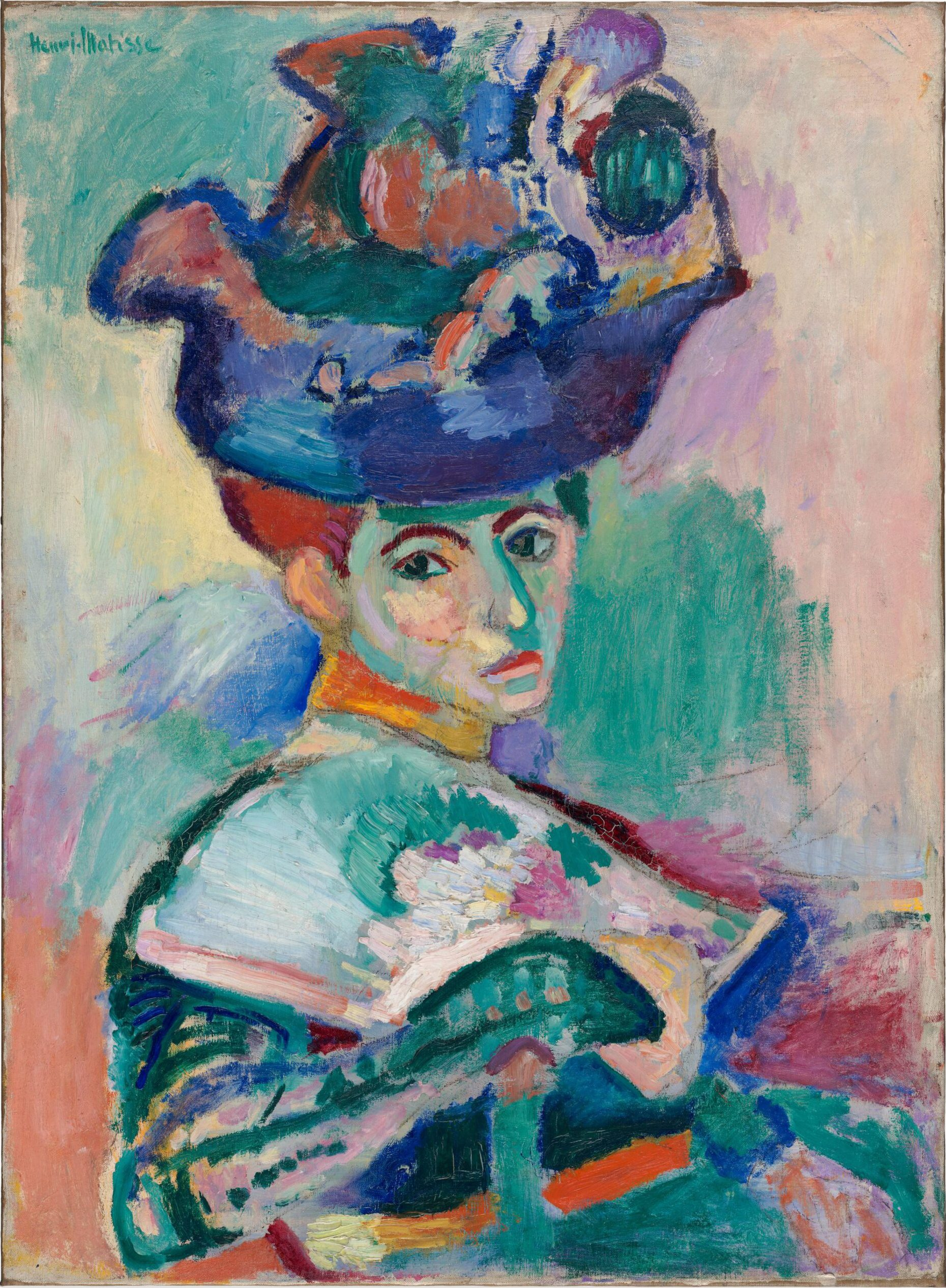
Henri Matisse, 1905, Woman with a Hat (Femme au chapeau), oil on canvas, 80.6 x 59.7 cm), San Francisco Museum of Modern Art

== History ==
In 1905, Matisse, Metzinger and Delaunay experimented with the technique of Divisionism, elaborating on the Neo-Impressionist principles of Georges Seurat, Henri-Edmond Cross and Paul Signac. Rather than using small pointillist patches of pure color, they began to employ larger brushstrokes of mixed color, forming patterns that resembled Byzantine mosaics. Signac and Cross evolved similarly, working in close contact with Matisse in Saint-Tropez during the summer of 1904. In Collioure the following year, Matisse painted his first fauve works alongside Derain.

In Femme au Chapeau, Metzinger pushed his Divisionist style further. The size of his cubes and the brightness of his color increase, without however tending toward a purely Fauve appearance. In contrast the Fauves, Metzinger's interest mathematics and geometry imbues his pairings with a sense of order, symmetry and the structured faceting. These characteristics inherent in Femme au Chapeau differ from Matisse's version of the subject. Metzinger emphasizes the boundaries of colored areas in a fashion not dissimilar to the Synthetist style of Paul Sérusier or Paul Gauguin, structured in various planes as the facets of crystals: something that would present itself in the artists subsequent phase associated with Cubism.

Metzinger explained his ideas to the American writer Gelett Burgess circa 1908–09:

"Instead of copying nature...we create a milieu of our own wherein our sentiment can work itself out through a juxtaposition of colors. It is hard to explain it, but it may perhaps be illustrated by analogy with literature and music... Music does not attempt to imitate nature's sounds, but it does interpret and embody emotions awakened by nature through a convention of its own, in a way to be aesthetically pleasing. In some such way, we, taking our hint from Nature, construct decoratively pleasing harmonies and symphonies of color expressive of our sentiment" (quoted in G. Burgess, "Wild Men of Paris," Architectural Record, May 1910, p. 413).

Christie's writes of Metzinger's Femme au chapeau in their Lot Notes:

"The firmly drawn construction of Metzinger's pictorial design superimposes hardness and solidity on every part of the artist's subject, and the background as well, in Femme au chapeau. This is an intended effect, which Metzinger contrasts by rendering these forms in a divisionist technique, which softens and refines the overall impact of the picture. Metzinger stated, "I ask of divided brushwork not the objective rendering of light, but irridescences and certain aspects of color still foreign to painting. I make a kind of chromatic versification, and for syllables, I use strokes which, variable in quality, cannot differ in dimension without modifying the rhythm of a picture phraseology destined to translate the diverse emotions aroused by nature" (quoted in R. Herbert, Neo-Impressionism, exh. cat., The Solomon R. Guggenheim Museum, New York, 1968, p. 221).

Following his youthful foray into divisionism, Metzinger turned briefly to a robust, Gauguinesque manner in rendering the figure, using strong outlines and flat areas of color. Then, in 1910, he became involved in the early development of Cubism, a decision that shaped his mature style. Burgess in his article did not hide a preference for Metzinger's paintings of 1907-1909: "Metzinger once did gorgeous mosaics of pure pigment, each little square of pigment not quite touching the next, so that an effect of vibrant light should result. He painted exquisite compositions of cloud and cliff and sea; he painted women and made them fair" (op. cit.).

== Provenance ==
- Galerie Zak, Paris.
- Frank Perls Gallery, Bevery Hills.
- Acquired from the above by Mr. and Mrs. Sidney F. Brody, 20 September 1955.
- Sale: Christie's, New York, Rockefeller Plaza, 4 May 2010, Lot 27. Estimate $800,000–$1,200,000. Sold $1,650,500

== Related works ==
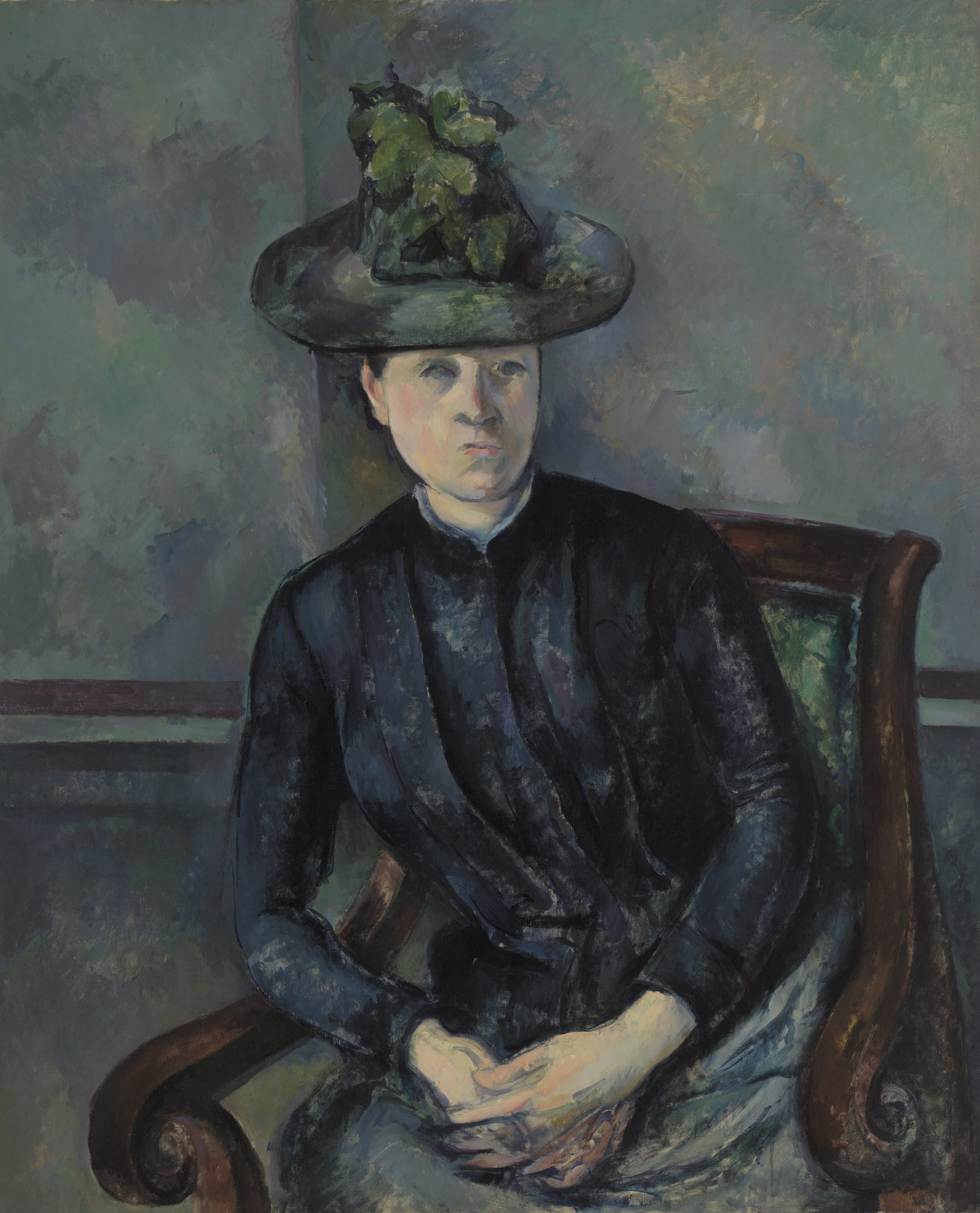
Paul Cézanne, 1894–95, Femme au Chapeau Vert (Woman in a Green Hat. Madame Cézanne), oil on canvas, 100.3 x 81.3 cm, The Barnes Foundation, Merion, PA

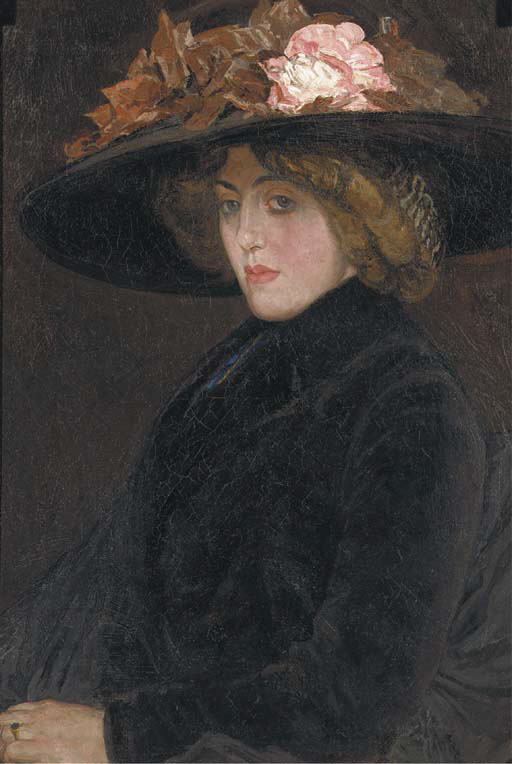
Leo Gestel, c. 1904–1906, Portrait of an elegant lady with a hat, oil on canvas, 73.5 x 50 cm

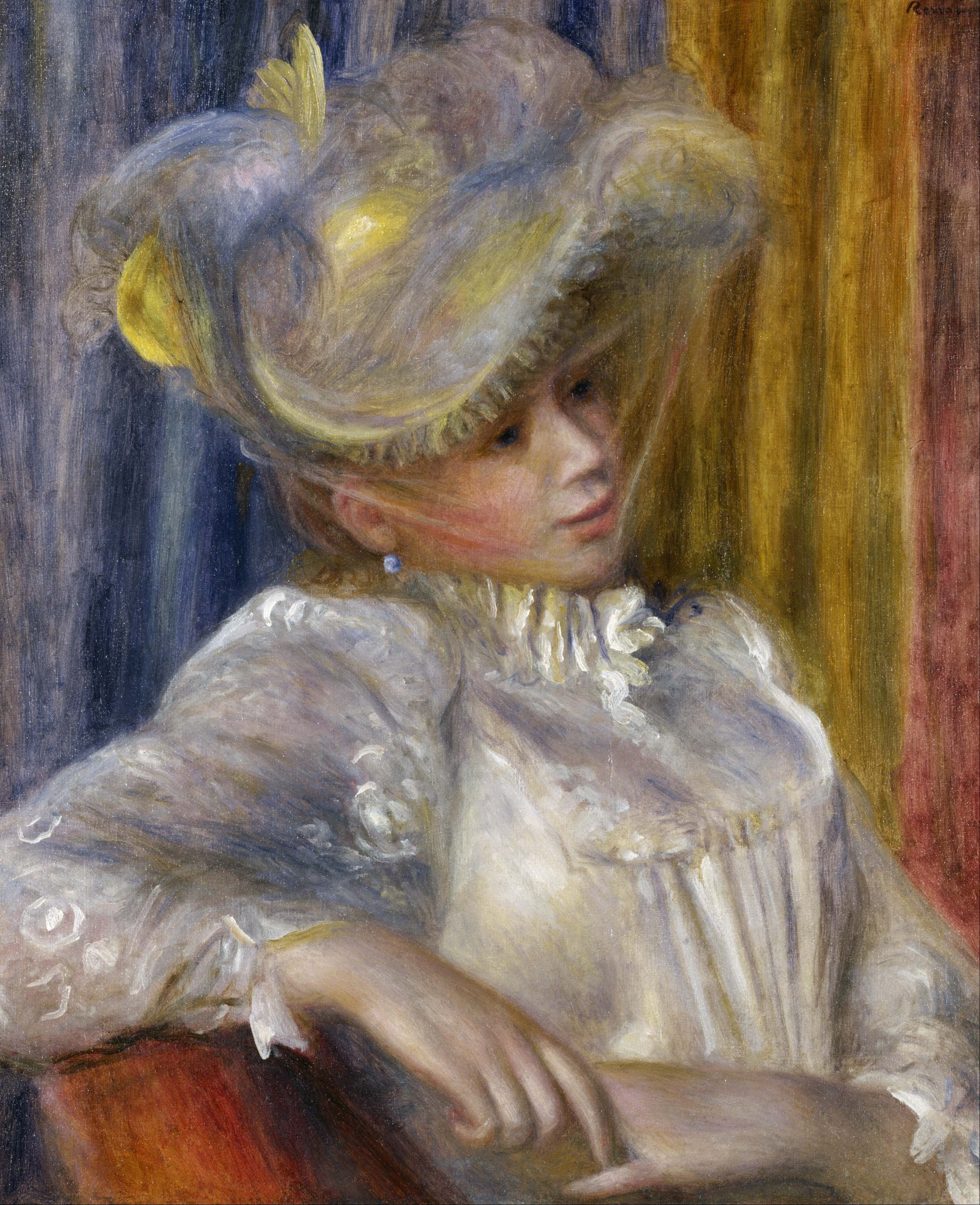
Pierre-Auguste Renoir, 1891, Woman with a Hat, oil on canvas, 56 x 46.5 cm, National Museum of Western Art, Tokyo

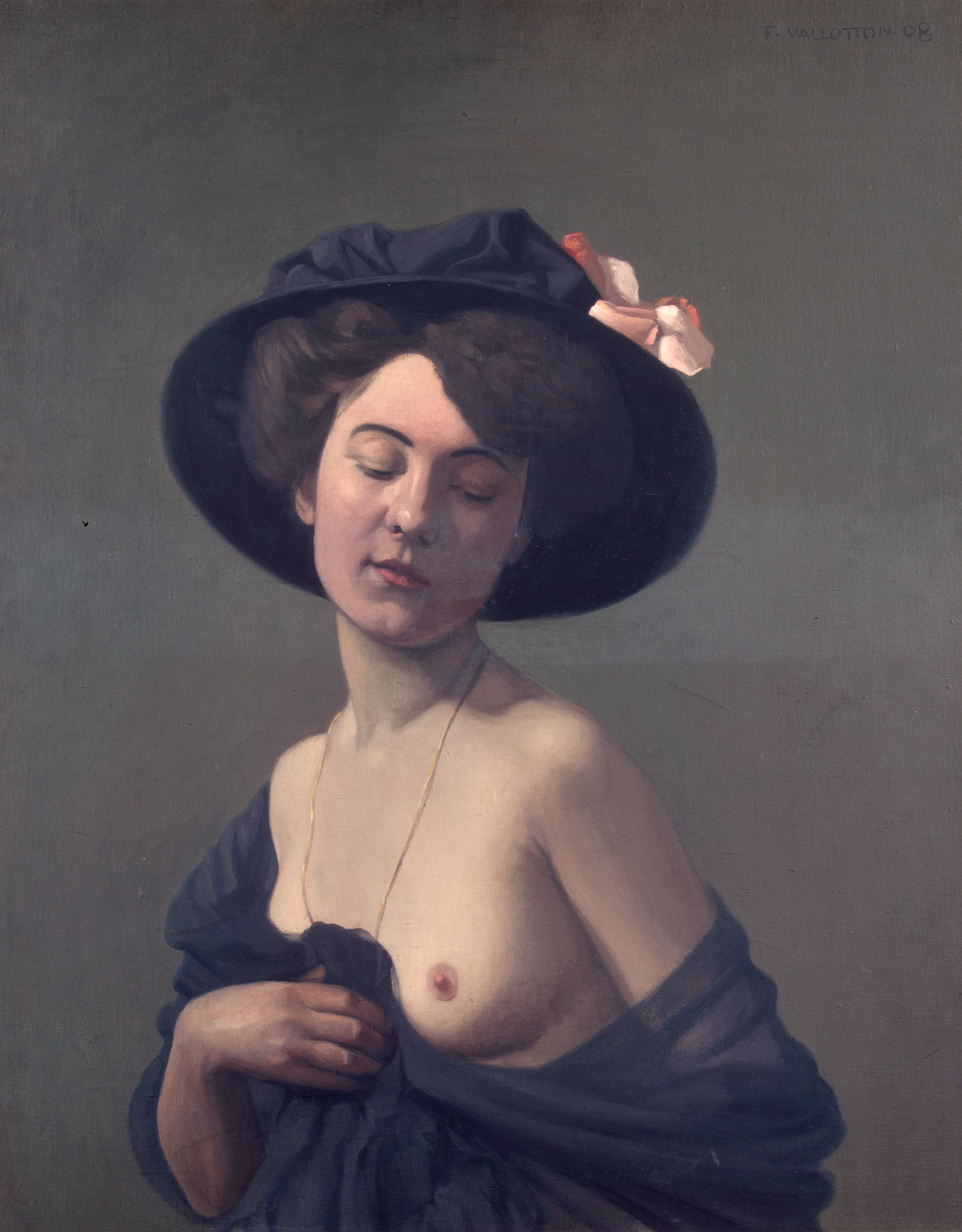
Félix Vallotton, Woman with a Black Hat

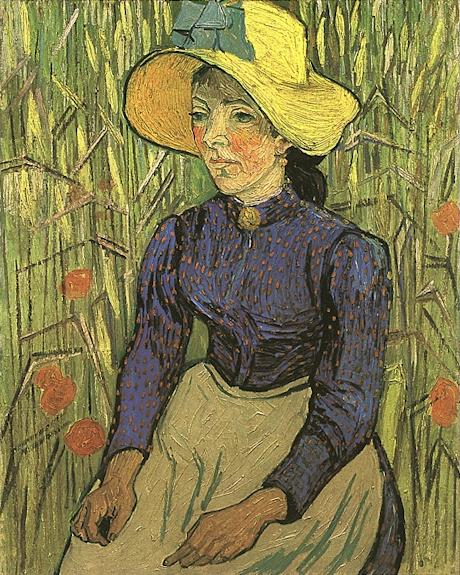
Vincent van Gogh, Young Peasant Woman with Straw Hat

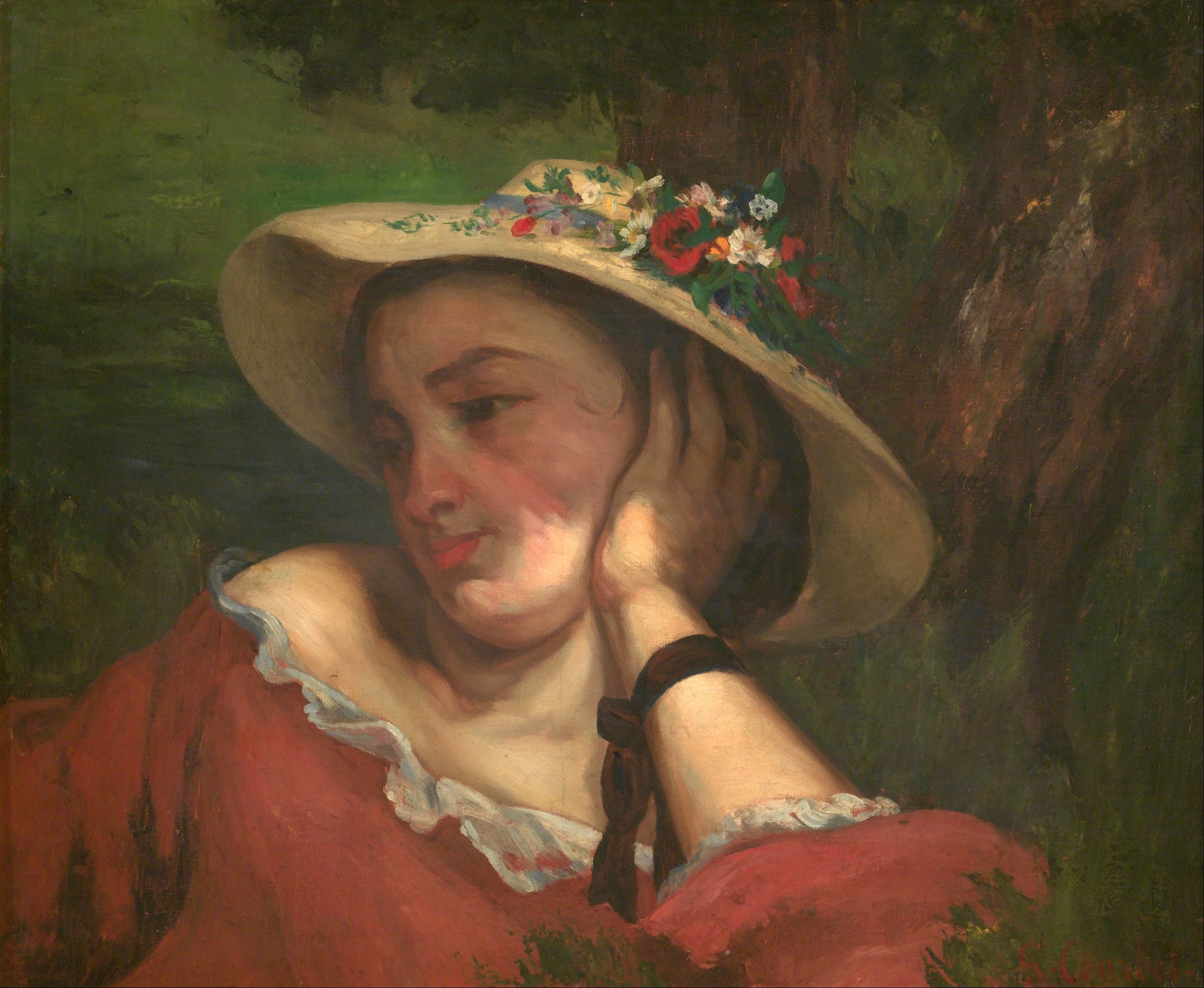
Gustave Courbet, 1857, Young Ladies on the bank of the Seine, detail of a painting (Woman with Flowers on Her Hat), National Gallery in Prague

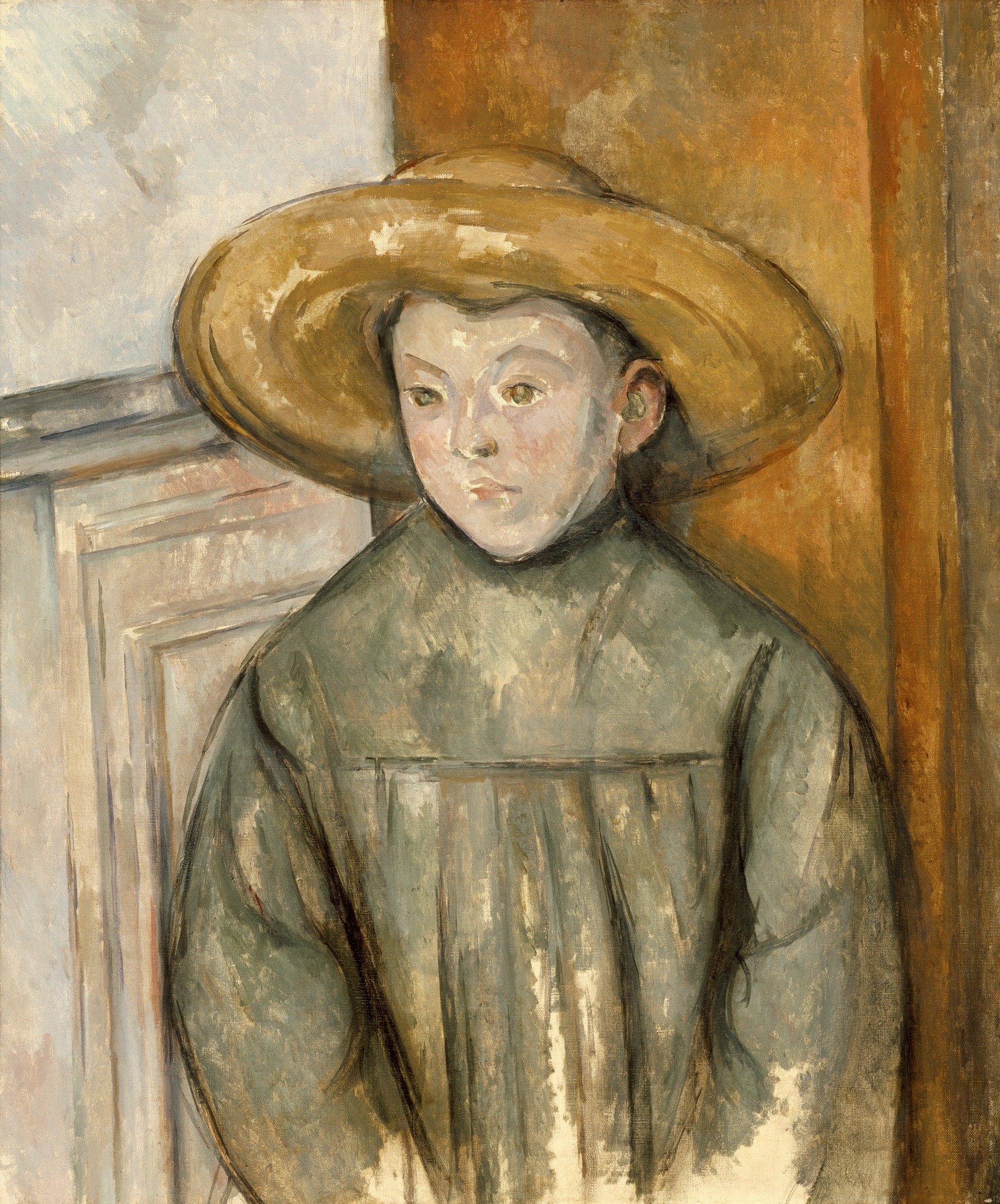
Paul Cézanne, 1896, Boy With a Straw Hat, 68.9 x 58.1 cm, Los Angeles County Museum of Art

Kees van Dongen, 1906, La femme au grand chapeau (Woman with large hat)

== See also ==
- List of works by Jean Metzinger
