= Colored Landscape with Aquatic Birds =

Painting by Jean Metzinger

- Paysage coloré aux oiseaux aquatiques (French)
- Artist: Jean Metzinger
- Year: c. 1907
- Medium: Oil on canvas
- Dimensions: 75.5 cm × 101 cm (29.7 in × 39.8 in)
- Location: Musée d’Art Moderne de la Ville de Paris; Paris

Colored Landscape with Aquatic Birds (French: Paysage coloré aux oiseaux aquatiques) is an oil painting created circa 1907 by the French artist and theorist Jean Metzinger. Paysage coloré aux oiseaux aquatiques is a Proto-Cubist work executed in a Post-Divisionist style with a unique Fauve-like palette. Metzinger's broad omnidirectional brushstrokes in the treatment of surfaces render homage to Paul Cézanne, while the luscious subtropical imagery in the painting are an homage to Paul Gauguin and Metzinger's friend Henri Rousseau.

Paysage coloré aux oiseaux aquatiques is located at the Musée d’Art Moderne de la Ville de Paris.

== Description ==
Paysage coloré aux oiseaux aquatiques is an oil painting on canvas in a horizontal format with dimensions 75.5 x 101 cm (29.7 by 39.8 in). The work represents three aquatic birds in an ambrosial Mediterranean landscape with semi-tropical vegetation, trees, a body of water, mountains and a sailboat in the background. The free and expressive brushstrokes of Paysage coloré aux oiseaux aquatiques—as in Les Ibis and Le Flamant rose et le voilier of the same period—represent a loosening of the mosaic-like Divisionist technique that characterized Metzinger's work from 1905 to early 1907.

By 1907 a select group of avant-garde artists in Paris were reevaluating their own work in relation to that of Paul Cézanne. A retrospective of Cézanne's paintings had been held at the Salon d'Automne of 1904. Current works were displayed at the 1905 and 1906 Salon d'Automne, followed by two commemorative retrospectives after his death in 1907. Metzinger's interest in the work of Cézanne suggests a means by which he made the transformation from Divisionism to Cubism.

The lattices of squares or 'cubes' of paint employed throughout his Divisionist period have not been entirely abandoned, but pushed to another extreme. Where before brushstrokes had become increasingly larger and organized into groups of color, now they were larger still and elongated, seemingly blended together directly on the canvas (rather than on a palette). The treatment of color and composition is globally free, loose, expressive, and thus dynamic. There are no inert tones. Colors have retained their brilliance. As before, contrasting hues are placed side by side—resulting in rhythmic and optic vibrational effects.

The lines and large strokes of color, like words, are treated autonomously—each possessing an abstract value independent of one another, yet together forming a coherent whole. The impulse toward abstraction becomes a primary quality of Metzinger's work of 1907. Though not without reference to the real world, Metzinger's treatment of the painted surface is meant to draw away from the outward appearance of nature. Imitation is vacated in order to concentrate upon the distillation of essential shapes and movements. These distilled forms were superior to nature because they partook of idea, and represented the dominance of the artist over the mere stuff of nature.

Complex in both composition and the rendering of color, the subject matter of Paysage coloré, though clearly readable, is to a certain extent faceted and denaturalized. Its combination of painterly techniques, color and exoticism in its subject matter, sets it apart, resulting in a broader scope typically employed to define the Fauve movement.

The spatial relationships between forms in the foreground and structures in the background are ambiguously flattened. Metzinger had already abandoned classical perspective for the most part since 1903, and now it had become entirely irrelevant.

This move towards a more geometrized form of Divisionism was critical in Metzinger’s evolution as an artist. His adherence to a mathematical division of space and form allowed for the flattening of depth perception—a key characteristic that would later be embraced by the Cubists. By 1905-06, Metzinger’s paintings, such as Two Nudes in an Exotic Landscape, already showed the clear influence of Georges Seurat’s geometric and linear structures, which would soon be taken up by the avant-garde, notably in the works of the Salon Cubists, but also in those of Picasso and Braque. The fusion of Seurat’s spatial divisions and Metzinger’s own vibrant, modular use of color and form created a new vocabulary, culminating in works such as La danse (Bacchante), that set the stage for the development of Cubist abstraction. Despite exhibiting with the Fauves, Metzinger’s approach to color and form remained distinct from theirs. His integration of geometry and an underlying structural approach made his work stand out as a bridge between the spontaneous color exploration of Fauvism and the more systematic, highly geometrized structures of Cubism. While Fauvism lacked a cohesive theoretical framework, focusing more on emotional expression through color, Metzinger’s work was driven by a clear philosophical and mathematical ambition that would soon evolve into a key component of early Cubism.

This composition was not only different from Paul Cézanne, Georges Seurat, Henri-Edmond Cross, Paul Sérusier, Maurice Denis and Odilon Redon and the other Neo-Impressionists, Symbolists and Nabis, but different from Henri Matisse, André Derain, Othon Friesz and the other Fauves. Indeed, Metzinger, unlike others of his immediate circle, or peripheral entourage, would soon become one of the founders of Cubism—flanked between Pablo Picasso and Georges Braque on the one hand, Albert Gleizes, Henri Le Fauconnier, Robert Delaunay, Fernand Léger on the other—and this painting was a step in that direction.

Note: in Jean Metzinger in Retrospect (1985), the title, dimensions and provenance for this painting, n. 19 of the catalogue, are erroneously switched with n. 18, Le Flamant rose et le voilier, (pages 40 and 41).

== Related works ==
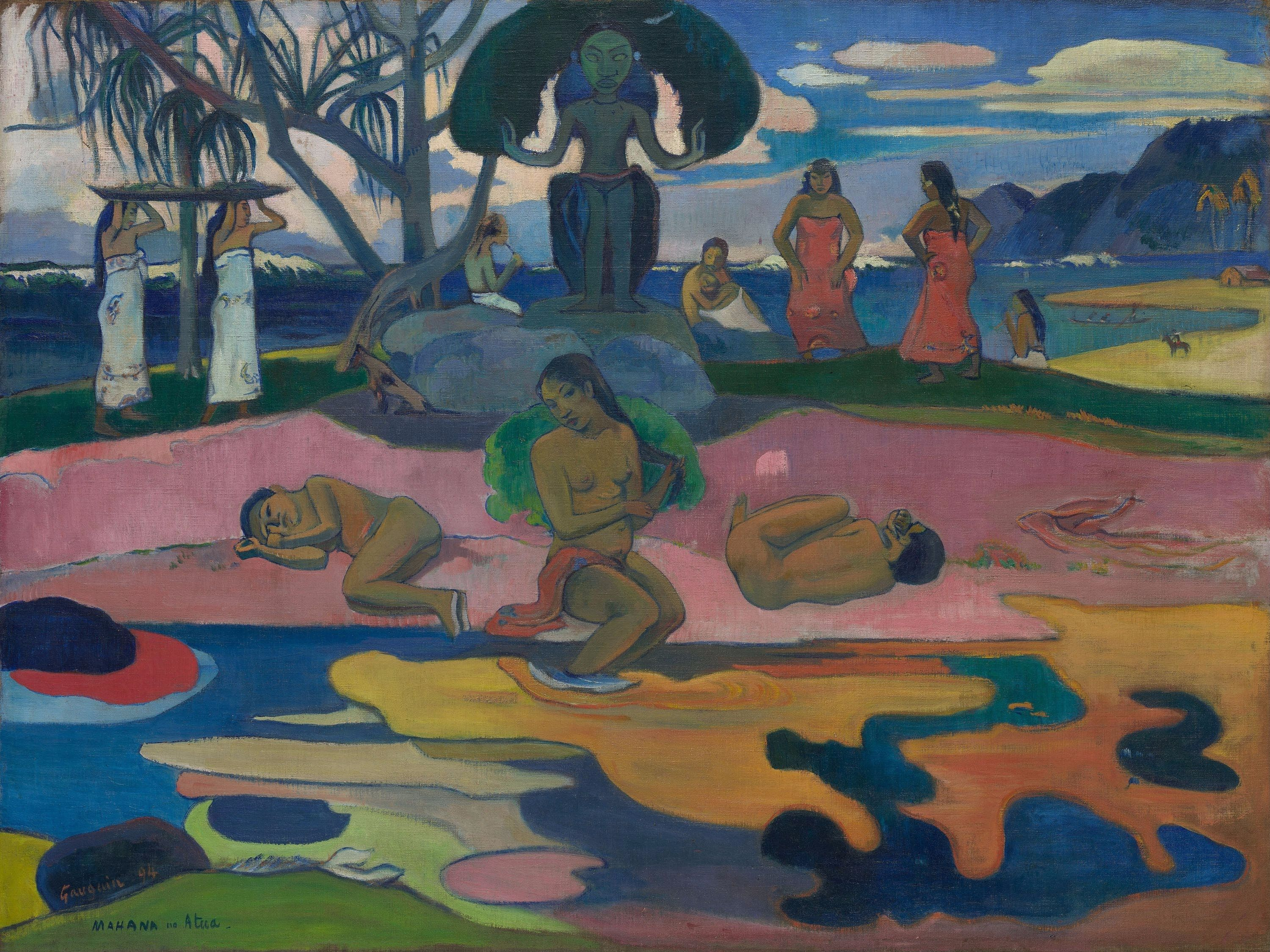
Paul Gauguin, 1894, Mahana no Atua (Day of the Gods, Jour de Dieu), oil on canvas, 66 x 87 cm (26 x 34.3 in), Art Institute of Chicago

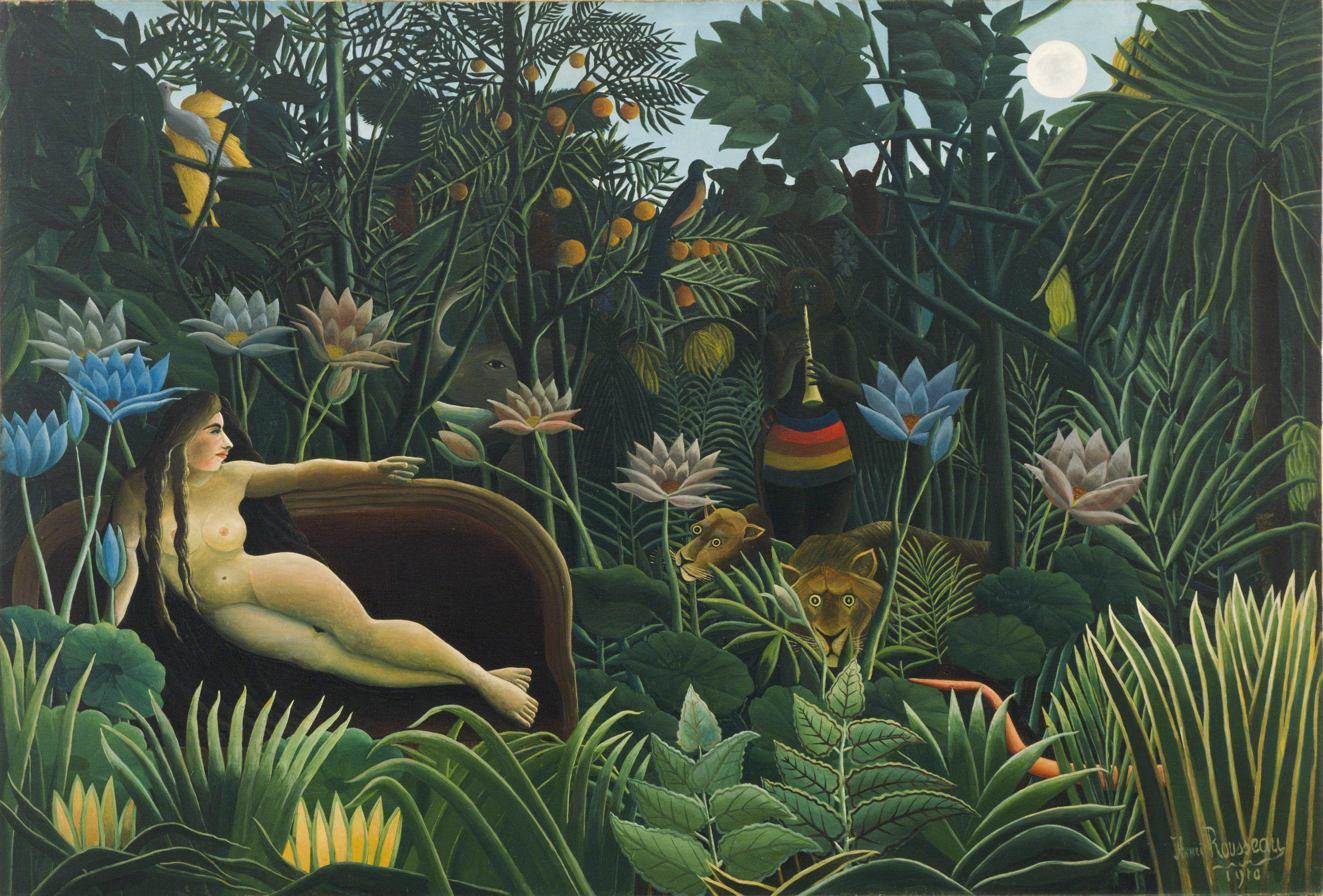
Henri Rousseau, 1910 Le rêve, oil on canvas, 204 x 298 cm, Museum of Modern Art, New York

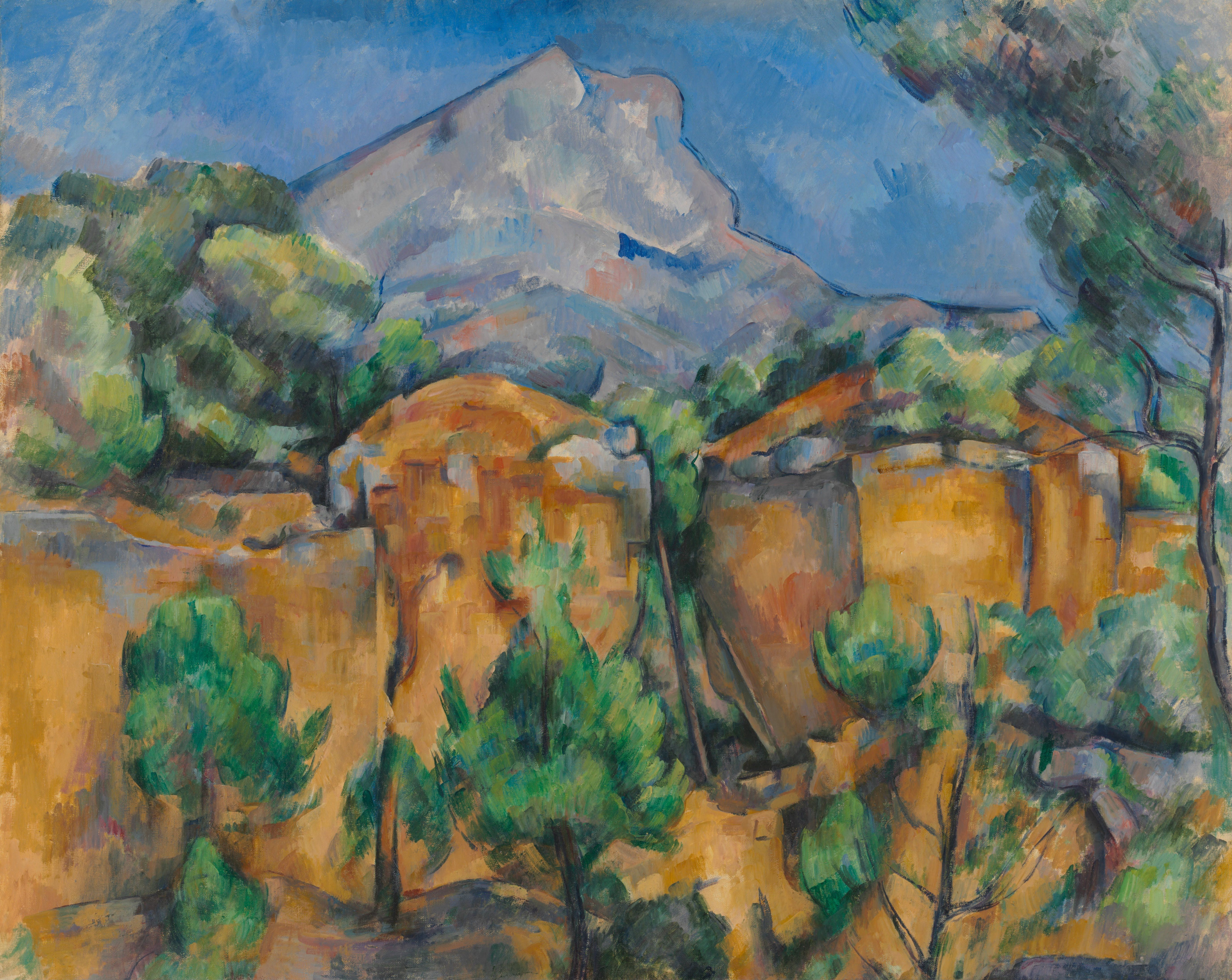
Paul Cézanne, 1897, Montagne Sainte-Victoire, oil on canvas, 65 x 81 cm, Baltimore Museum of Art

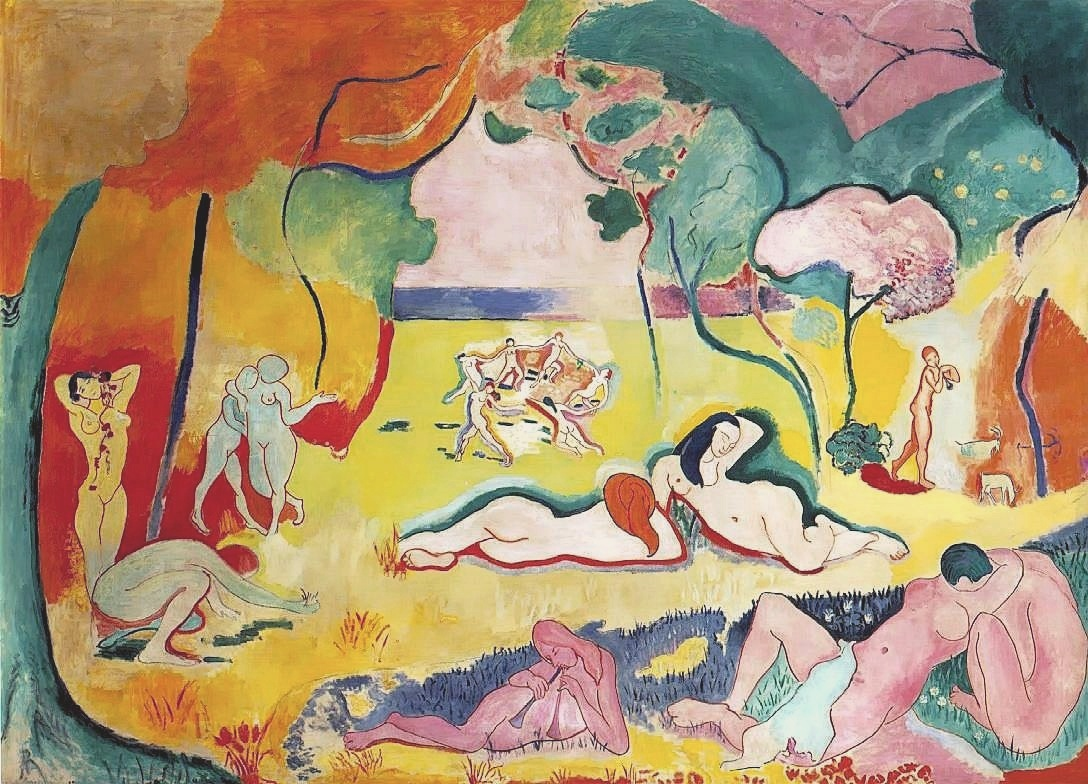
Henri Matisse, 1905–06, Le bonheur de vivre, oil on canvas, 175 x 241 cm, Barnes Foundation

== See also ==
- List of works by Jean Metzinger
