= Nu à la cheminée =

Painting by Jean Metzinger

Nu à la cheminée (Nude)
- Artist: Jean Metzinger
- Year: 1910 (in Paris)
- Type: Black & white reproduction (1912)
- Dimensions: Unknown
- Location: Whereabouts unknown

Nu à la cheminée, also referred to as Nu dans un intérieur, Femme nu, and Nu or Nude, is a painting by Jean Metzinger. The work was exhibited in Paris at the Salon d'Automne of 1910, and the Salon de la Section d'Or, Galerie La Boétie in Paris, October 1912. It was published in Du "Cubisme", written by Jean Metzinger and Albert Gleizes in 1912, and subsequently published in The Cubist Painters, Aesthetic Meditations (Les Peintres Cubistes) by Guillaume Apollinaire, 1913. By 1912 Nu à la cheminée was in the collection of M.G. Comerre (the mother of Albert Gleizes, and sister of Léon Comerre, the academic/Symbolist painter who won the Gand Prix de Rome in 1875). The work has not been seen in public since, its current location is unknown.

Nu à la cheminée provoked considerable scandal upon its presentation at the Salon d’Automne and remains a focal point of scholarly debate. Its notoriety stemmed not merely from its audacity, but from its distinction as the first unequivocally Cubist canvas to be exhibited in a major public salon. Visitors were confronted with a radically new pictorial language—what Metzinger himself termed "mobile perspective"—that challenged conventional modes of visual representation. The painting’s controversy was compounded by its striking formal affinity with the works of Picasso and Braque, who, bound to Kahnweiler's exclusive gallery circle, were notably absent from the exhibition. In this context, Metzinger's work signaled a turning point: the public unveiling of Cubism as a revolutionary aesthetic force, no longer confined to the margins of artist studios or private galleries but projected onto the grand stage of the Grand Palais.

== Overview ==
Until 1910 P. Picasso, J. Metzinger, and G. Braque were the only pioneers of the movement [...] and it was they who originated the term cubism. (Maurice Raynal)

Jean Metzinger, judging from an interview with Gelett Burgess in Architectural Record, appears to have abandoned his Divisionist style in favor of the faceting of form associated with analytic Cubism around 1908 or early 1909. A resident of Montmartre, Metzinger frequented the Bateau Lavoir at this time and exhibited with Georges Braque at the Berthe Weill gallery. By 1910, the robust form of early analytic Cubism of Picasso (Girl with a Mandolin, Fanny Tellier, 1910), Braque (Violin and Candlestick, 1910) and Metzinger (Nu à la cheminée, Nude, 1910) had become practically indistinguishable.

As opposed to depicting the subject matter classically from one point of view, Metzinger used a concept he enunciated for the first time in Note sur la peinture (published in Pan, 1910), of 'mobile perspective' to portray the subject from a variety of angles. The images captured from multiple spatial view-points and at successive intervals in time are shown simultaneously on the canvas.

The similarity between Metzinger's own work of 1910 to that of Picasso is exemplified in his Nu à la cheminée. The style of lips in both Metzinger's Nude and Picasso's Portrait of Wilhelm Uhde (spring-automn 1910) bear resemblance to each other (both are in the form of an "X"). So too, both pictures merge the model with the environment, blurring the distinction between background and foreground. Metzinger, however—in addition to the simultaneous views and multiple perspective—has included the image of a clock in the upper right quadrant, a fact that reveals Metzinger's didactic visual and literary reference to the physicist, mathematician and philosopher of science Henri Poincaré, and to the philosopher Henri Bergson's 'duration'.

Such mathematical and philosophical inferences had little in common with the paintings of Picasso or Braque. Metzinger's interpretation targeted a wide audience—as opposed to private gallery collectors—exhibits in abundance an underlying idealism, a temporal reconstruction of dissected subjects based on the principles of non-Euclidean geometry. These inferences were compelling because they offered a stimulating and intelligible rationale for his innovations—consistent with contemporary intellectual trends in literature; notably with the Abbaye de Créteil group and Bergson's philosophy.

== Geometrical follies ==
Jean Metzinger, 1910–11, Deux Nus (Two Nudes, Two Women), oil on canvas, 92 × 66 cm, Gothenburg Museum of Art, Sweden. Exhibited at the first Cubist manifestation, Room 41 of the 1911 Salon des Indépendants, Paris

At the 1910 Salon des Indépendants the works of Metzinger (Nu, n. 3635, possibly Nu à la cheminée, and Portrait de M. Guillaume Apollinaire, n. 3636), Albert Gleizes, Henri Le Fauconnier, and Robert Delaunay were hung in close proximity, where the mutual geometric interests, then observable collectively, began to unite as a group sensibility. Critics had begun treating these mutual interests as a single style, though the term Cubism would not emerge until the following spring relative to the same artists, on the occasion of the Salon des Indépendants. The autumn of 1910 saw Metzinger's Nude as the most purely Cubist work shown.

In a review of the 1910 Salon d'Automne, published in La Presse, art critique Edmond Epardaud writes of the 'geometric follies' of Metzinger, and describes both Gleizes and Le Fauconnier as 'specious architects' (architectes fallacieux).

The critic Jean Claude writes in his review of the same salon, with reference to Nu à la cheminée, published in Le Petit Parisien, "Metzinger painted a puzzle, cubic and triangular, which after verification, is a naked woman. I managed to discover the head, torso and legs. I had to give up finding arms. This is beyond comprehension".

A few months earlier, reviewing the Indépendants, the critic Louis Vauxcelles had described Gleizes, Metzinger, Le Fauconnier, Delaunay and Léger as "ignorant geometers".

Roger Allard reviewing the 1910 Salon d'Automne used the terms "analytical" and "synthesis" in relation to Metzinger's Nu à la cheminée:

Metzinger's nude and his landscape are ruled by an equal striving for fragmentary synthesis. No usual cliché from the aesthetic vocabulary fits the art of this disconcerting painter. Consider the elements of his nude: a woman, a clock, an armchair, a table, a vase with flowers...such, at least, is an account of my personal inventory. The head whose expression is very noble is rendered formally, and the artist seems to have drawn back from the integral application of his law. [...] The analytical kinships among objects and their mutual subordinations will be henceforth of little importance since they will be suppressed in the painted realization. These come into play later, subjectively, in each individual's mental realization.

"The importance of Allard's understanding of the genuine innovation visible at the salon is hard to overestimate," writes art historian Daniel Robbins, "He goes well beyond Metzinger's emphasis in the Pan article on multiple points of view, that is, beyond the technical innovations of the new painting. He penetrates to its intellectual core: an art capable of synthesizing a reality in the mind of the observer..."

Albert Gleizes, in his review of the 1911 Salon des Indépendants writes about Metzinger's Nu à la cheminée:

In short, he wishes to develop the visual field by multiplying it, in order to inscribe it within the space of the canvas itself. It is at that point that the cube will play a role, and it is there that Metzinger will use that means to reestablish a balance that has been momentarily interrupted by these audacious inscriptions.

At the last Salon d'Automne [1910], we were able to get an idea of that technique, inscribed and set out in simple terms.

His Femme nu, depicted from various angles and in integral relationship with the setting, the shapes very subtly nestled one into another, was more like a masterful demonstration of the total image than an exclusively pictorial creation.

Certain discriminating critics [...] considered it a metaphysical discovery more than a manifestation of art. Alembics, laboratory tubing, intellectual masturbation—people have called his work all those things, with the greatest seriousness in the world.

== See also ==
- List of works by Jean Metzinger
