= Two Nudes in an Exotic Landscape =

Painting by Jean Metzinger

Bathers: Two Nudes in an Exotic Landscape
- Baigneuses: Deux nus dans un paysage exotique (French)
- Artist: Jean Metzinger
- Year: c. 1905
- Medium: Oil on canvas
- Dimensions: 116 cm × 88.8 cm (45 3/8 in × 35 in)
- Location: Thyssen-Bornemisza Museum, Madrid

Two Nudes in an Exotic Landscape (also Bathers: Two Nudes in an Exotic Landscape; French: Baigneuses: Deux nus dans un paysage exotique) is an oil painting created circa 1905 by the French artist and theorist Jean Metzinger (1883–1956). Two Nudes in an Exotic Landscape is a Proto-Cubist work executed in a highly personal Divisionist style during the height of the Fauve period. The painting is part of Carmen Cervera's art collection and its exhibited in the Thyssen-Bornemisza Museum, Madrid

== Description ==
Jean Metzinger, c.1906, Femme au Chapeau (Woman with a Hat), oil on canvas, 44.8 x 36.8 cm, Korban Art Foundation

Two Nudes in an Exotic Landscape is an oil painting on canvas with dimensions 116 x 88.8 cm (45 3/8 by 35 in), signed Metzinger (lower right). The work—consistent in style with other works by Metzinger created circa 1905–1906, such as Femme au Chapeau (Woman with a Hat)—represents two nude women, one seen from the rear and the other from a more frontal position, in a lush, tropical, or subtropical setting. The landscape contains a wide variety of exotic geometrized elements (trees, bushes, flowers, a lake or river, a mountain range and a partly cloudy sky). Metzinger's use of color in Two Nudes is extremely Fauve; quasi-pure reds, greens, blues and violets, juxtaposed in groups as if randomly.

While the two nudes are treated with rather natural colors, the rest of the canvas appears treated with more artificial tints, tones, hues and shades. Unlike other Fauve works of the same period by Henri Matisse, André Derain, Maurice de Vlaminck or Kees van Dongen, Metzinger's composition is strongly Cézannian. The vertical format and light colors of the sky and treatment of foreground and background elements create a flattening of spatial perspective, reminiscent of Georges Seurat, or Paul Cézanne's 'multiple viewpoints', his search for order, discipline and permanence. However, the brushstrokes and overall appearance are not at all Cézannian in nature.

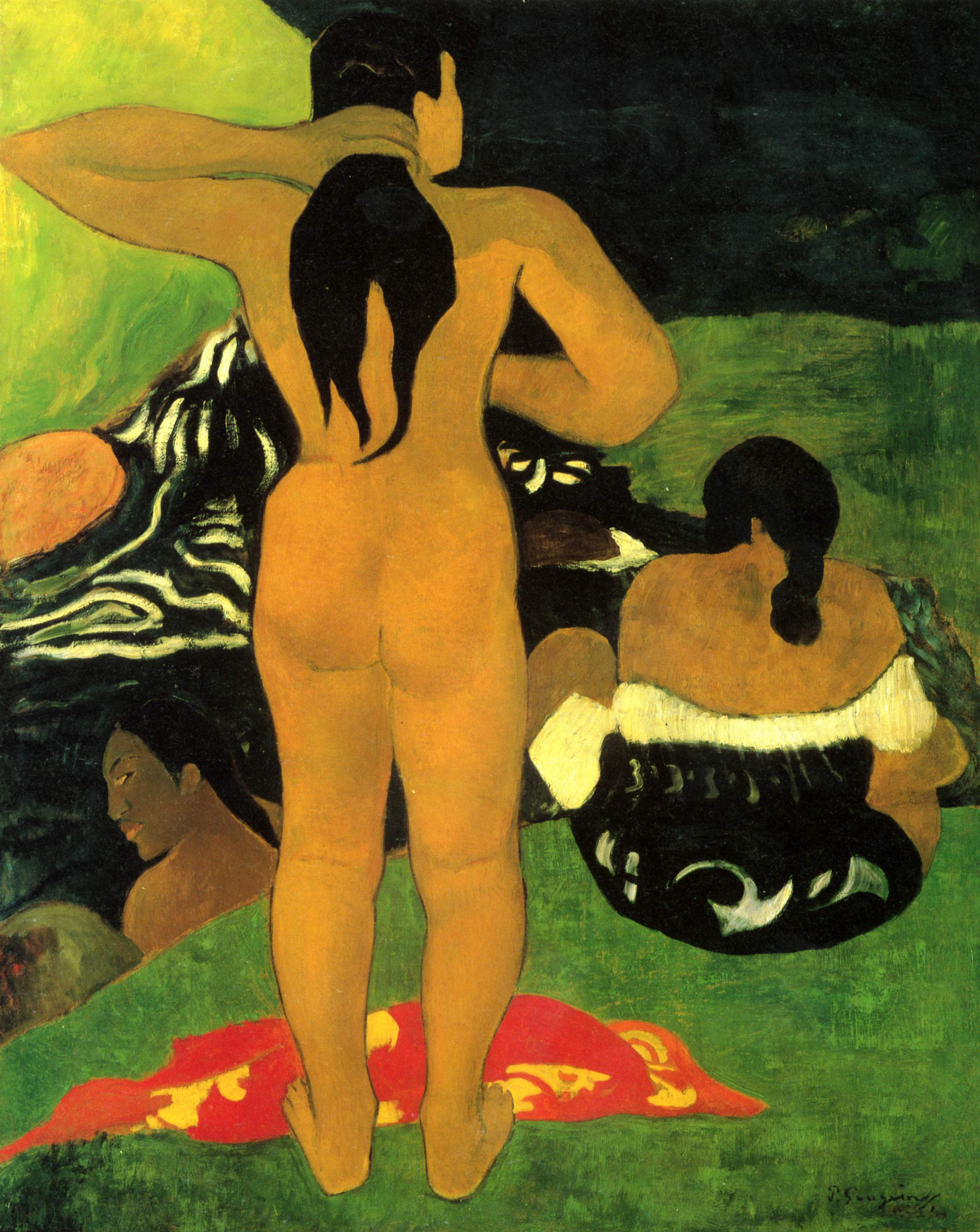
Paul Gauguin, 1892, Tahitiennes sur la plage, oil on canvas, 109.9 cm × 89.5 cm (43.3 in × 35.2 in), Metropolitan Museum of Art, New York

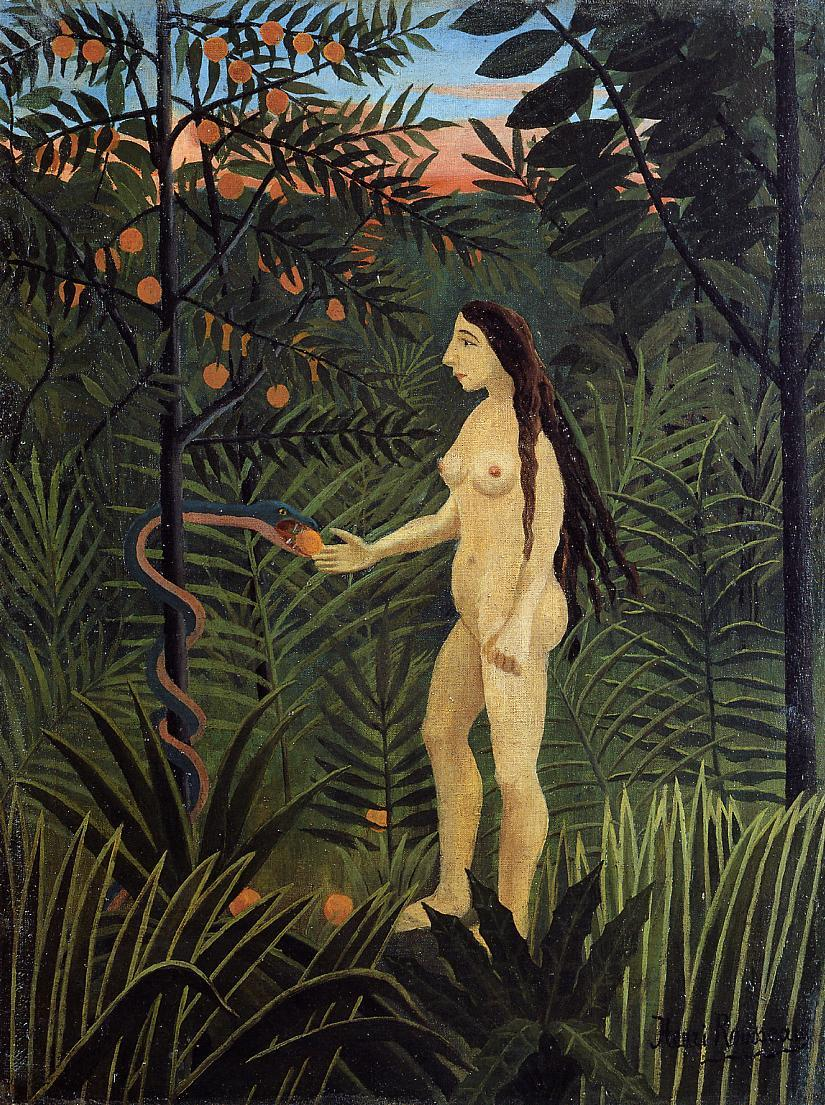
Henri Rousseau, c. 1905–07, Eve and the Serpent, oil on canvas, 61 x 46 cm, Kunsthalle Hamburg, Germany. Delaunay met Rousseau in 1906, and it is likely that Metzinger met Rousseau around the same time.

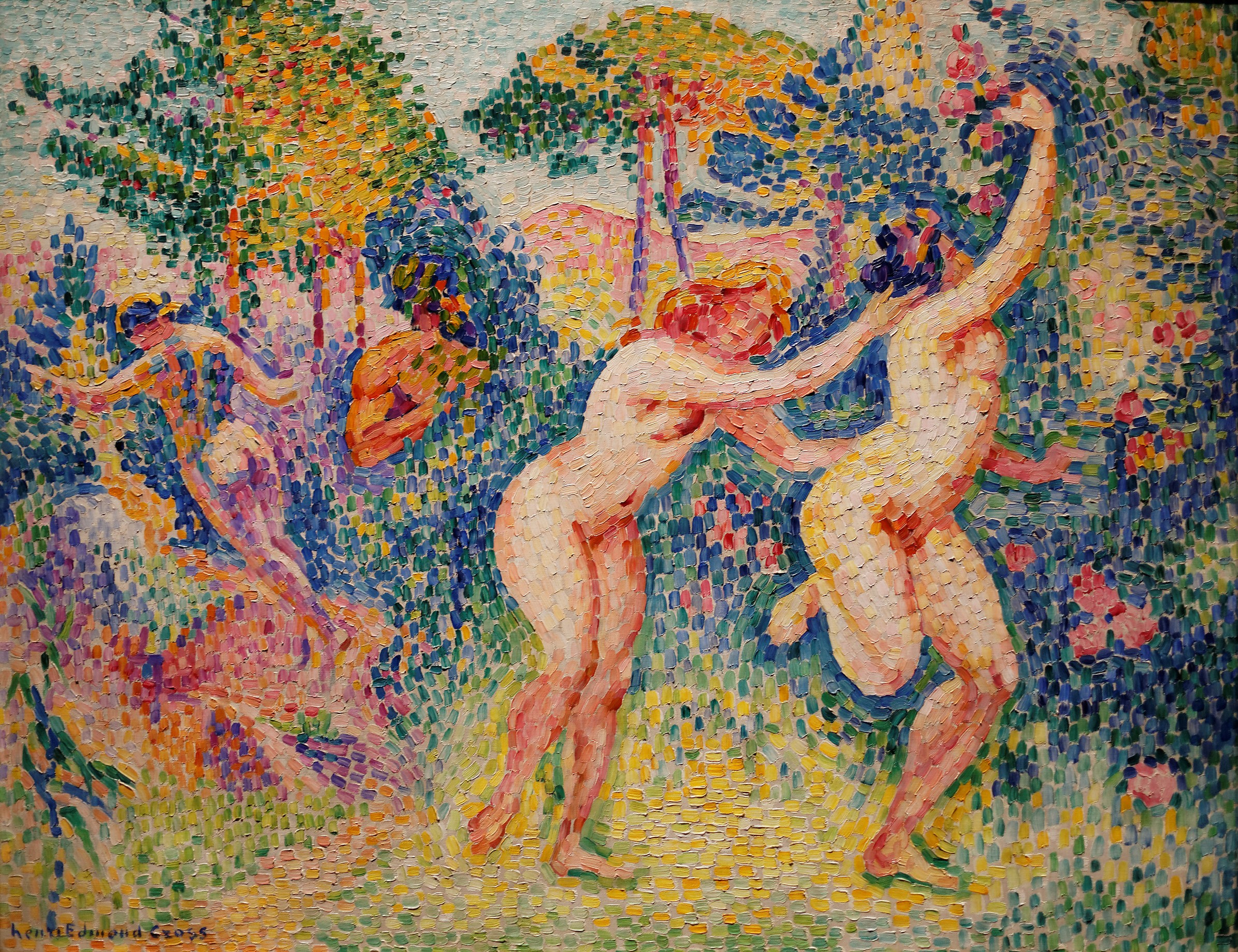
Henri-Edmond Cross, c. 1906, La fuite des nymphes, oil on canvas, 71 x 92 cm, Musée d'Orsay

== History ==
By 1905 Neo-Impressionism had witnessed a major resurgence, with recent exhibitions by Maximilien Luce (Galerie Druet, March 1904), Paul Signac (Galerie Druet, December 1904), Georges Seurat (Salon des Indépendants, 1905), Henri-Edmond Cross (Galerie Druet, March–April 1905). Metzinger's unique style of Neo-Impressionism resulted from the unification of several influences in addition to that of Seurat and Cézanne; that of Vincent van Gogh, with his heavy impasto, dense brushstrokes; and—following posthumous retrospective exhibitions at the Salon d'Automne in 1903 and 1906—that of Paul Gauguin, with its exotic sumptuousness and sensuality. By this time Metzinger had already developed a full-fledged Divisionist facture with large, bold mosaic-like brushwork, beyond that of Cross or Signac.

In statement made circa 1907 regarding his mosaic-like Divisionism—where both size and direction of his cubes of color are fundamental to the rhythm of the painting—Metzinger cites parallels with Neo-Impressionism painters and Symbolist literature:

"I ask of divided brushwork not the objective rendering of light, but iridescence and certain aspects of color still foreign to painting. I make a kind of chromatic versification and for syllables I use strokes which, variable in quantity, cannot differ in dimension without modifying the rhythm of a pictorial phraseology destined to translate the diverse emotions aroused by nature." (Metzinger, 1907)

This statement seems to relate directly to Two Nudes in an Exotic Landscape as well as other works of the same period such as La Danse (Bacchante), and Coucher de soleil no. 1 (ca.1906)

"Metzinger's Neo-Impressionist period was somewhat longer than that of his close friend Delaunay." Robert Herbert writes: "At the Indépendants in 1905, his paintings were already regarded as in the Neo-Impressionist tradition by contemporary critics, and he apparently continued to paint in large mosaic strokes until some time in 1908. The height of his Neo-Impressionist work was in 1906 and 1907, when he and Delaunay did portraits of each other (Art market, London, and Museum of Fine Arts Houston) in prominent rectangles of pigment. (In the sky of Coucher de soleil, 1906–1907, Collection Rijksmuseum Kröller-Müller is the solar disk which Delaunay was later to make into a personal emblem.)"

The vibrating image of the sun in Metzinger's painting, and so too of Delaunay's Paysage au disque (1906–1907), "is an homage to the decomposition of spectral light that lay at the heart of Neo-Impressionist color theory..." (Herbert, 1968) (See, Jean Metzinger, Rijksmuseum Kröller-Müller, Otterlo)

Metzinger's work (1905–06) compared with two works by Gino Severini (1910–11). Size ratio is correct.

Gino Severini, 1911, La Danseuse Obsedante (The Haunting Dancer, Ruhelose Tanzerin), oil on canvas, 73.5 x 54 cm

Jean Metzinger, 1905–06, Two Nudes in an Exotic Landscape, oil on canvas, 116 x 88.8 cm

Gino Severini, 1910–11, La Modiste (The Milliner), oil on canvas, 64.8 x 48.3 cm

Each individual square of pigment associated with another of similar shape and color to form a group; each grouping of color juxtaposed with an adjacent collection of differing colors; just as syllables combine to form sentences, and sentences combine to form paragraphs, and so on. Now, the same concept formerly related to color has been adapted to form. Each individual facet associated with another adjacent shape form a group; each grouping juxtaposed with an adjacent collection of facets connect or become associated with a larger organization—just as the association of syllables combine to form sentences, and sentences combine to form paragraphs, and so on—forming what Metzinger would soon describe as the 'total image'.

The bilateral symmetry inherent in Two Nudes in an Exotic Landscape is striking (even if only as an approximation). The proto-Cubist geometry is solidly constructed but the equilibrium is unstable or short-lived. Each tile of pigment juxtaposed one next to the other forms a section of the painting, containing between 10 and 50 'tiles'. Each section is dominated by blues, reds, and greens. There is no smooth transition between these section. The painting is divided, fragmented, splintered or faceted into series, not only of individual rectangles, squares or 'cubes' of color, but into individual planes or surfaces delineated by color and form, already pointing towards Cubism.

That is not say that Two Nudes in an Exotic Landscape belongs to analytic or synthetic Cubism. It does not. The subject is viewed from one point of view, not several. There is no true 'mobile perspective', anymore than in the works of Cézanne or Seurat. But a departure from nature it was, and a departure from all that had been painted to date it was too; a precursor in style, certainly, one that would resurface in the works of Metzinger and others (Gino Severini, Robert Delaunay, Piet Mondrian) several years later, within the context of Cubism.

== Cubic and pictorial phraseology ==
Metzinger's work (1905–06) compared with a painting by Robert Delaunay (1910–11)

Jean Metzinger, 1905–06, Two Nudes in an Exotic Landscape, oil on canvas, 116 x 88.8 cm, Thyssen-Bornemisza Museum, Madrid.

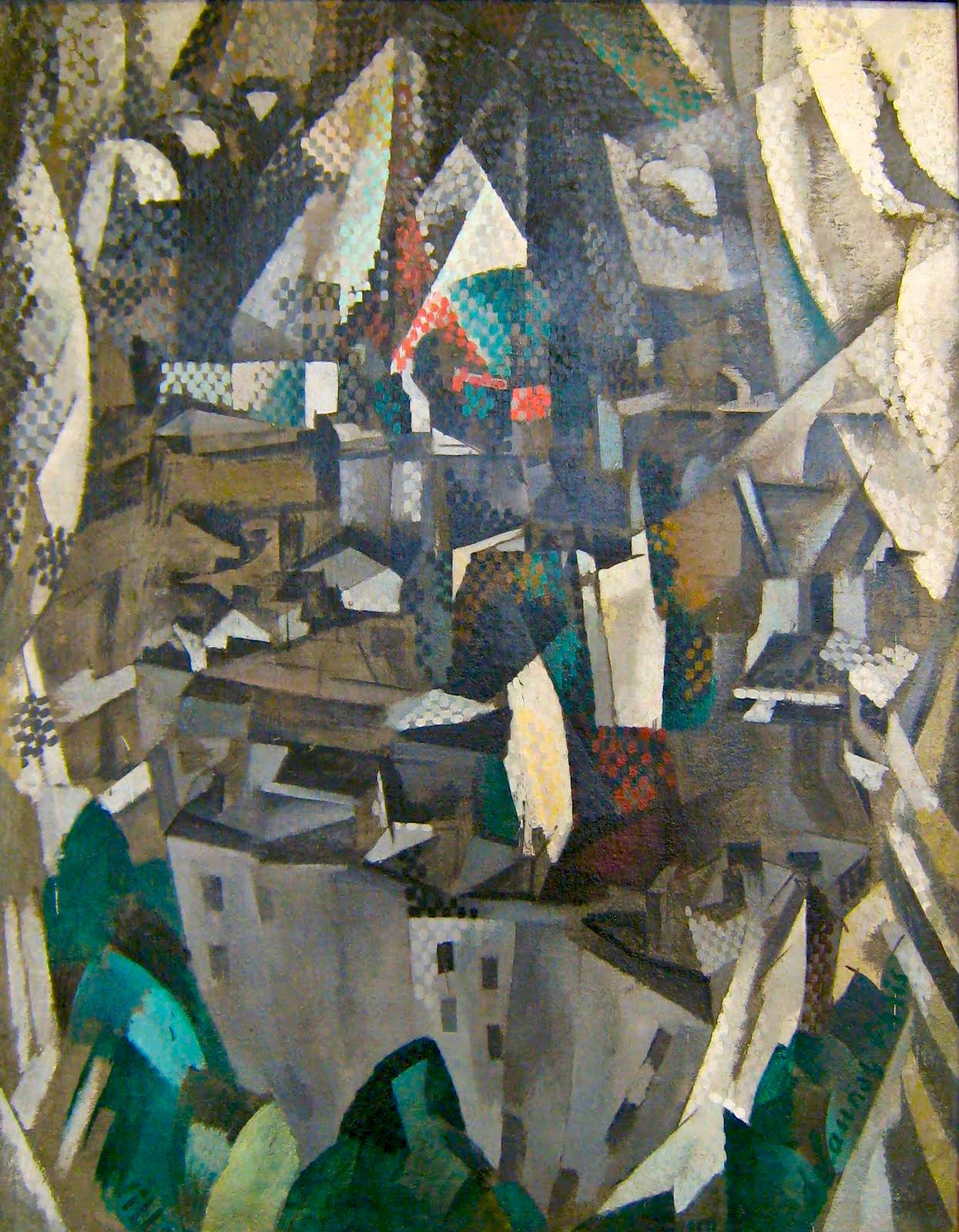
Robert Delaunay, 1910, La ville no. 2, oil on canvas, 146 x 114 cm, Musée National d'Art Moderne, Centre Georges Pompidou, Paris

Two Nudes in an Exotic Landscape signified more than just the incorporation of a radical geometry that would free Metzinger and others from the confines of nature as any artwork executed in Europe to date. This indeed was Neo-Impressionism, Divisionism, albeit in a highly altered form. Beyond the decomposition of spectral light at the core of Neo-Impressionist color theory, Two Nudes surpassed the teachings of Cross or Signac. It contained "iridescences", in Metzinger's terms, certain "aspects of color still foreign to painting". It contained a "chromatic versification", as if for syllables. The rhythm of its pictorial phraseology translated the diverse emotions aroused by nature. It no longer represented nature as seen, but was a complete byproduct of the human 'sensation.'

Art critic Louis Chassevent, writing about the 1906 Salon des Indépendants, used the word "cube" with reference to Jean Metzinger and Robert Delaunay, two and a half years before similar references would be made by Louis Vauxcelles to baptize the Proto-Cubist or Cubist works Pablo Picasso or Georges Braque. Recognizing the difference between Metzinger and his contemporaries Louis Chassevent wrote in 1906:

"M. Metzinger is a mosaicist like M. Signac but he brings more precision to the cutting of his cubes of color which appear to have been made mechanically." (Robert Herbert, 1968, Neo-Impressionism, The Solomon R. Guggenheim Foundation, New York)

The following year Metzinger and Delaunay shared an exhibition at Berthe Weill's gallery (1907). They were singled out by Louis Vauxcelles as Divisionists who used large, mosaic-like 'cubes' to construct small but highly symbolic compositions.

One and a half years later, November 1908, Vauxcelles, in his brief review of Georges Braque's exhibition at Kahnweiler's gallery, called Braque a daring man who despises form, "reducing everything, places and a figures and houses, to geometric schemas, to cubes.

Among Metzinger’s earliest landmarks on the path toward Cubism, Baigneuses (Two Nudes in an Exotic Landscape) stands as a paradigmatic example of proto-Cubist experimentation—a pivotal moment in which the artist began to dismantle the inherited conventions of pictorial illusionism in favor of an autonomous and abstracted plastic language. Executed circa 1905, this painting reflects a bold synthesis of Neo-Impressionist technique, Cézannian structure, and Symbolist undertone, yet it moves decisively beyond them, announcing a vision that would culminate in the full Cubist idiom by the close of the decade.

== Exhibitions ==
- Le néo-impressionnisme, de Seurat à Paul Klee, catalogue Editions de la Réunion des musées nationaux, pp. 360–361, Musée d’Orsay, Paris, 15 March – 10 July 2005
- Gauguin y el viaje a lo exótico, catalogue no. 34, p. 146, Museo Thyssen-Bornemiza, Madrid, 9 October 2012 – 13 January 2013
- Femina Feminae, Muses and the Collector, From Piazzetta to Delaunay, 10 Museu Carmen Thyssen Andorra, October 2018 – 10 September 2019

== Provenance ==
- Zwemmer Gallery, London
- Private Collection (acquired from the above in 1951)
- Acquired in 1982, private collector
- Sotheby's London, Impressionist & Modern Art, Day Sale, 4 February 2004, Lot 251

Lot Notes:

The present work is one of a small number of Metzinger compositions fusing a broad, divisionist facture with a fauve palette. This group, which includes the celebrated Paysage coloré aux oiseaux exotiques (Musée d'Art Moderne de la Ville de Paris), represented the artist's response to the Salon d'Automne of 1905, a review of which saw Louis Vauxcelles coin the term 'Fauve' to describe the circle of artists using bright colour and broad brushstrokes. While on this occasion Metzinger did not exhibit with Matisse, Braque and Vlaminck, since 1904 he had shown alongside these artists who were gaining notoriety as Fauves, notably at the Salons des Indépendants.

In the departure from the Neo-Impressionist manner of Metzinger's early years, Baigneuses: Deux nus dans un paysage exotique substitutes the exuberant palette and broader handling of his peers. In both composition and facture though, the work retains a rather more rigorous structure than other Fauve landscapes of the period. Its arcadian subject and a mosaic-like application of paint give a uniquely individual flavour to what Metzinger termed his 'chromatic poetry'.

- Carmen Thyssen-Bornemisza Collection, Spain

== See also ==
- List of works by Jean Metzinger
- Deux Nus
- Femme au Chapeau
- Paysage coloré aux oiseaux aquatique
