= List of works by Jean Metzinger =

(1902-1907)

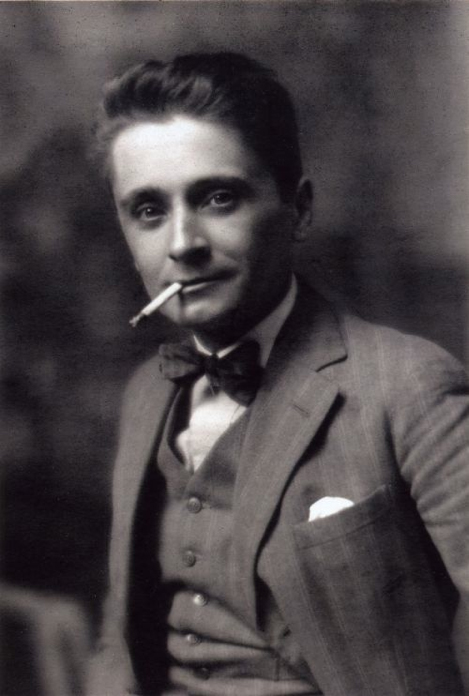
Jean Metzinger, photograph circa 1912

This is an incomplete list of works by the French modern artist Jean Metzinger (June 24, 1883 – November 3, 1956). He is admired as a painter, theorist, writer, critic, and poet. Between 1902 and 1907, Metzinger worked in a combination of Neo-Impressionist, Divisionist and Fauvist styles. A Cézannian component in his work during this phase produced some of the earliest proto-Cubist works.

In the words of S.E. Johnson, an in-depth analysis of Metzinger's Pre-Cubist period—his first artistic peak—"can only class that painter, in spite of his youth, as being already one of the leading artistic personalities in that period directly preceding Cubism. [...] In an attempt to understand the importance of Jean Metzinger in Modern Art, we could limit ourselves to three considerations. Firstly, there is the often overlooked importance of Metzinger's Divisionist Period of 1900–1908. Secondly, there is the role of Metzinger in the founding of the Cubist School. Thirdly, there is the consideration of Metzinger's whole Cubist Period from 1909 to 1930. In taking into account these various factors, we can understand why Metzinger must be included among that small group of artists who have taken a part in the shaping of Art History in the first half of the Twentieth Century."

From 1908, Metzinger experimented with the faceting of form, a style that would soon become known as Cubism. His involvement in Cubism saw him both as an influential artist and principal theorist of the movement.

Metzinger, a sensitive and intelligent theoretician of Cubism, sought to communicate the principles of this movement through his paintings as well as his writings.

Many exhibitions document the painter's national and international success. His works can be found in private and public collections and institutions around the world.

The artist died in Paris on November 3, 1956.

== Paintings ==
Painting	Name	French name	Year	Technique	Dimensions	City	Gallery	Ref
	Rose Flower in a Vase	Fleur rose dans un vase	1902	oil on canvas	22 x 27 cm	Paris	Private collection	
	The Clearing	Clairière	c. 1903	oil on canvas	54 x 72.5 cm		Private collection	
	Landscape	Paysage	1904	oil on canvas	54 x 65.1 cm	Chapel Hill, NC	Ackland Art Museum, University of North Carolina	
	The Low Tide	La Marée Basse	c. 1904	oil on canvas	32.3 x 40.2 cm		Private collection	
		Le chemin a travers les champs	c. 1904	oil on canvas	39 × 46.5 cm		Private collection	
	Landscape	Paysage	c. 1904	oil on canvas	65 × 92 cm		Private collection	
	The Seashore	Bord de mer (Le Mur Rose)	1904-05	oil on canvas	64.5 x 91.2 cm	Indianapolis	Indianapolis Museum of Art	
		La Tour de Batz au coucher du soleil	1904-05	oil on canvas	54 x 73 cm			
		Le Château de Clisson	1904-05	oil on canvas	54.5 x 73.5 cm	Nantes	Musée des Beaux-Arts de Nantes	
	Landscape with Two Cypresses	Paysage au deux Cypres	1904-05	oil on canvas	60.1 x 81.2 cm		Private collection	
		Paysage	1904-05	oil on canvas	43 x 64 cm		Private collection	
		Femme assise au bouquet de feuillage	1905	oil on canvas	65.5 x 54 cm		Private collection	
	Still Life	Nature morte	1905	oil on canvas	38 x 47 cm		Private collection	
	Jeune Fille au Fauteuil	Femme nue au chignon assise	1905	oil on canvas	91.8 x 73 cm.	New York	Private collection	
	Neo-Impressionist Landscape	Paysage Neo-Impressionniste	1905	oil on canvas	41 x 33 cm	Troyes	Musée d'art moderne de Troyes	
	Nude in a landscape	Nu dans un paysage	1905-06	oil on canvas	73 x 54 cm		Private collection	
	Two Nudes in a Garden	Deux nus dans un jardin	1905-06	oil on canvas	91.4 x 63.8 cm	Iowa City	University of Iowa Museum of Art	
	Two Nudes in an Exotic Landscape	Baigneuses: Deux nus dans un jardin exotique	1905-06	oil on canvas	116 × 88.8 cm	Madrid	Thyssen-Bornemisza Museum	
	Basse-Normandy		1905-06	oil on canvas	88.4 x 128.4 cm		Private collection	
	A Peacock		1906	oil on canvas	61 x 47.2 cm		Private collection	
	Landscape	Coucher de Soleil No. 1	c. 1906	oil on canvas	72.5 x 100 cm	Otterlo	Kröller-Müller Museum	
	The Dance	La danse (Bacchante)	c. 1906	oil on canvas	73 x 54 cm	Otterlo	Kröller-Müller Museum	
	Flamingos		c. 1906	oil on canvas	32.5 x 40.3 cm		Private collection	
	Parc Montsouris, Morning	Matin au Parc Montsouris	1906	oil on canvas	49.9 x 67.7 cm		Private collection	
	Nude	Nu	1906	oil on canvas	47 x 63.5 cm	West Palm Beach	Norton Museum of Art	
	Landscape with a round tree	Paysage a l'arbre rond	c. 1906	Oil on panel	22 x 27.5 cm		Köln Städtische Museen im Überblick	
		Petit port, pêcheurs et bateaux au quai	1906	oil on canvas	54 x 73 cm		Private collection	
	Portrait of Delaunay	Portrait de Delaunay	1906	oil on canvas	54.9 x 43.2 cm	Houston, Texas	Museum of Fine Arts, Houston	
	Saint-Tropez		1906	oil on canvas	54.5 x 73 cm		Private collection	
	Woman with a Hat	Femme au Chapeau	1906	oil on canvas	44.8 x 36.8 cm		Korban Art Foundation	
	Landscape with Fountain		1906-07	oil on canvas	53.3 x 73.6 cm		Private collection	
		Paysage pointilliste	1906-07	oil on canvas	54.5 x 73 cm		Private collection	
	Tropical Landscape	Paysage Tropical	1906-07	oil on canvas	89.5 x 62.7 cm			
	Colored Landscape with Aquatic Birds	Paysage coloré aux oiseaux aquatiques	1906-07	oil on canvas	74 x 99 cm		Musée d'Art Moderne de Paris	
		Les Ibis	1907	oil on canvas	54 x 73 cm		Private collection	
	Bathers	Baigneuses	c. 1908	oil on cardboard	27 x 21.5 cm		Location unknown	
	Landscape	Paysage	c. 1908-09			Location unknown	Illustrated in Gelett Burgess, The Wild Men of Paris, The Architectural Record, 1910	
	Nude	Nu à la cheminée (Nu)	1910	oil on canvas			Location unknown	
	Portrait of Apollinaire	Portrait d'Apollinaire	1910	oil on canvas	55 x 46 cm		Private collection	
	Two Nudes, Two Women	Deux nus	1910-11	oil on canvas	92 x 66 cm	Gothenburg, Sweden	Gothenburg Museum of Art	
	Standing Nude	Nu debout	1910-11	oil on canvas	51.7 x 35 cm	Montréal	Musée des beaux-arts de Montréal	
	Madame Metzinger		c. 1911	oil on canvas	26.7 x 21 cm	Philadelphia	Philadelphia Museum of Art	
	Portrait of Madame Metzinger		c. 1911	Pencil and ink on paper	22.6 x 15.7 cm	Los Angeles	Los Angeles County Museum of Art	
		Dame au décolleté	c. 1911	oil on canvas	72.9 x 60 cm	New York	Private collection	
	Tea Time	Le Goûter	1911	oil on canvas	75.9 x 70.2 cm	Philadelphia	Philadelphia Museum of Art	
	Study for Tea Time	Etude pour Le Goûter	1911	graphite and ink on paper	19 x 15 cm	Paris	Musée National d'Art Moderne, Centre Georges Pompidou	
	Still Life	Nature morte	1911	oil on canvas	61 x 50 cm		Private collection	
	Still Life	Nature morte (Compotier et cruche décorée de cerfs)	1911-12	oil on canvas	93.5 by 66.5 cm		Private collection	
	The Harbor	Le Port	1911-12	oil on canvas			Location unknown	
	Man with a Pipe (Portrait of an American Smoker)		1911-12	oil on canvas	92.7 x 65.4 cm	Appleton	Lawrence University, Appleton, Wisconsin	
	Study for the portrait of Apollinaire	Etude pour le portrait de Guillaume Apollinaire	1911	graphite on paper	48 x 31.2 cm	Paris	Musée National d'Art Moderne, Centre Georges Pompidou	
	Woman with a horse	La Femme au Cheval	1911-12	oil on canvas	162 x 130 cm	Copenhagen	Statens Museum for Kunst	
	Portrait		1912	oil on canvas	64.8 x 54 cm.	Cambridge, Massachusetts	Fogg Museum, Harvard University	
	Sailboats	Scène du port	c. 1912	oil on canvas	54 x 46 cm.	Ithaca	Herbert F. Johnson Museum of Art, Cornell University	
	Landscape		1912–14?	oil on canvas	73 x 92.1 cm	New York City	Museum of Modern Art	
	The Harbor	Le port	1912	oil on canvas	85 x 100.3 cm	Dallas	Dallas Museum of Art	
	Dancer in a café	Danseuse au café	1912	oil on canvas	146.1 x 114.3 cm	Buffalo, New York	Albright-Knox Art Gallery	
	Woman with a Fan	Femme à l'Éventail	1912	oil on canvas	90.7 x 64.2 cm	New York	Solomon R. Guggenheim Museum	
	Femme au chapeau rose et collier de perles		1912	oil on canvas	92 x 65 cm		Private collection	
	La Plume Jaune	The Yellow Feather	1912	oil on canvas	73 x 54 cm		Private collection	
	Landscape	Marine, Composition Cubiste	1912	oil on canvas	51.4 x 68.6 cm.	Cambridge, Massachusetts	Fogg Museum, Harvard University	
	At the Cycle-Race Track	Au Vélodrome (Le cycliste)	1912	oil on canvas	130.4 x 97.1 cm	Venice	Peggy Guggenheim Collection	
	The Bathers	Les Baigneuses	1912-13	oil on canvas	148.3 x 106.4 cm	Philadelphia	Philadelphia Museum of Art	
	The Blue Bird	L'Oiseau bleu	1912-13	oil on canvas	230 x 196 cm	Paris	Musée d'Art Moderne de Paris	
	Man with Pipe	Le Fumeur	c.1912-13	oil on canvas	129.7 x 96.68 cm	Pittsburgh, PA	Carnegie Museum of Art	
	In the Canoe, The Boat (Im Boot)	En Canot (Femme au Canot et à l'Ombrelle)	1913	oil on canvas	146 x 114 cm		Missing, presumed destroyed	
	Woman with a Fan	Femme à l'Éventail	1913	oil on canvas	92.7 x 65.7 cm	Chicago	Art Institute of Chicago	
	The Smoker	Le fumeur	1914	charcoal on paper	56.1 x 45.2 cm	New York City	Museum of Modern Art	
	Soldier at a Game of Chess	Soldat jouant aux échecs (Le Soldat à la partie d'échecs)	1914-15	oil on canvas	81.3 x 61 cm	Chicago	Smart Museum of Art	
	The Nurse	L'infirmière	1915					
	View through the Open Window	Paysage à la fenêtre ouverte	1915	oil on canvas	73.3 x 54.5 cm	Nantes	Musée des Beaux-Arts de Nantes	
	Lady at her Dressing Table	Femme au miroir (Femme à sa toilette)	1916	oil on canvas	92.4 x 65.1 cm		Private collection	
	Woman with Lace	Femme à la dentelle	1916	oil on canvas	65 x 54 cm	Paris	Musée d'Art Moderne de Paris	
	Fruit and a Jug on a Table		1916	oil on canvas	115.9 x 81 cm	Boston, Massachusetts	Museum of Fine Arts, Boston	
	Still Life with Lamp		1916	oil on canvas	81.2 x 60.5 cm	New York City	Museum of Modern Art	
	Landscape	Paysage	1916-17	oil on canvas	59.2 x 73 cm	Chicago	Art Institute of Chicago	
	Still Life, Playing Cards, Coffee Cup and Apples		1917	oil on canvas	81 x 65 cm		Private collection	
	Still Life with Fish		1917?	oil on canvas	46 x 55 cm	Nantes	Musée des Beaux-Arts de Nantes	
	Still Life	Nature morte avec fruits et pitcher	1917	oil on canvas	80 x 61 cm	Madrid	Fundación Telefónica	
	Table by a window		1917	oil on canvas	81 x 65.1 cm	New York City	Metropolitan Museum of Art	
	Still Life	Nature morte	1918	oil on canvas	73 x 54.3 cm	Chicago	Art Institute of Chicago	
	Still Life with Box	Nature morte avec boîte	c.1918	oil on canvas	60 x 81 cm	New Orleans	New Orleans Museum of Art	
		Femme face et profil (Femme au verre)	1919	oil on canvas	65 x 50 cm	Paris	Musee National d'Art Moderne, Centre Georges Pompidou	
	Seated Woman		1919	Gouache and crayon on paper	38 x 28.5 cm	Chicago	Art Institute of Chicago	
	Still life in an oval	Nature morte oval	1919	oil on canvas	60 x 81 cm	Otterlo	Kröller-Müller Museum	
	Woman with a Coffee Pot	La Femme à la cafetière	1919	oil on canvas	115.3 × 81 cm	London	Tate Gallery	
	Landscape	Paysage	1919–1920	oil on canvas	81 x 65 cm	Paris	Musée National d'Art Moderne, Centre Georges Pompidou	
	City Landscape		1919-20	oil on canvas	53.3 × 80.9 cm	Iowa City	University of Iowa Museum of Art	
	Still Life with a Jug and a Pipe		1919	oil on canvas	81 x 60 cm	Otterlo	Kröller-Müller Museum	
	Still Life with Apples		1919	oil on canvas	100 x 74 cm	Otterlo	Kröller-Müller Museum	
	The Knitter	La Tricoteuse	1919	oil on canvas	116.5 x 81 cm	Paris	Musée National d'Art Moderne, Centre Georges Pompidou	
	Still Life	Livre et pipe rouge	1919	oil on canvas	79.5 x 62.5 cm	Madrid	Fundación Telefónica	
	Still life	Nature morte	1919	oil on canvas	73.3 x 100 cm	Bilbao	Bilbao Fine Arts Museum	
	Still Life with a Tray		1920	oil on canvas	38.5 x 60.9 cm	Otterlo	Kröller-Müller Museum	
	Landscape	Paysage	c. 1921	oil on canvas	60 x 81.3 cm	Edinburgh	Scottish National Gallery	
	The Three Trees		c. 1921	oil on canvas	54.3 cm x 73.3 cm	Ann Arbor	University of Michigan Museum of Art	
	Still Life	Nature morte	1921	oil on canvas		Minneapolis	Minneapolis Institute of Arts	
	Embarkation of Harlequin	Arlequin	1922-23	oil on canvas	162 x 112 cm		Private collection	
		Le Bal masque (Carnaval a Venise)	1922	oil on canvas	60 x 81 cm		location unknown	
		Jeune Femme à la Mandoline	1923(?)	oil on canvas	100 x 73 cm		Private collection	
	Clown with a banjo	Clown au banjo	1924	oil on canvas	100 x 73.3 cm		Private collection	
	Portrait of Léonce Rosenberg	Portrait de Léonce Rosenberg	1924	pencil on paper	50 x 36.5 cm	Paris	Musée National d'Art Moderne, Centre Georges Pompidou	
	Le Bal masqué, La Comédie Italienne		1924	oil on canvas	88.9 x 130.2 cm		Private collection	
	Salome		1924	oil on canvas	92.2 x 64.8 cm		Private collection	
	Young woman with a guitar	Femme à la guitare	1924	oil on canvas	92 x 64.9 cm	Otterlo	Kröller-Müller Museum	
		Equestrienne	1924	oil on canvas	81 x 60 cm	Otterlo	Kröller-Müller Museum	
	Circus Equestrienne		1924	oil on canvas	162.2 x 114.3 cm	New York City	Metropolitan Museum of Art	
	Country Seat with Horsemen		1924	oil on canvas	60.5 x 81 cm	Otterlo	Kröller-Müller Museum	
		Les Arlequins	1925	oil on canvas	97.8 x 146 cm		Private collection	
	Woman with pheasant	Pêches et faisan	1926	oil on canvas		Otterlo	Kröller-Müller Museum	
	Still life with black vase	Nature morte	1926	oil on canvas	60 x 80.5 cm)	Otterlo	Kröller-Müller Museum	
		La Roulette	1926	oil on canvas	97.8 x 146 cm		Private collection	
	Still Life With Roulette Wheel		1926	oil on canvas	38.1 x 56 cm	Iowa City	University of Iowa Museum of Art	
		Jeune fille à la partition	1927	oil on canvas	92 x 73 cm		Private collection	
	Still Life with a Green Head	Nature morte	1927	oil on canvas	65 x 92 cm	Otterlo	Kröller-Müller Museum	
		Composition allegorique	1928-29	oil on canvas	54 x 73 cm	Paris	Musée d'Art Moderne de Paris	
		L'Isthme de Corinthe	1928	oil on canvas	73 x 54 cm		Private collection	
	Female Nude on board Ship		1928	oil on canvas	100 x 73 cm	Otterlo	Kröller-Müller Museum	
	Nautical Still Life		1930	oil on canvas	54.0 x 73.4 cm	Melbourne	National Gallery of Victoria	
		Femme stylisée au masque	1930	oil on canvas	91.8 x 65 cm		Private collection	
	Globe and Banjo		1930	oil on canvas	56 x 92 cm	Chicago	Art Institute of Chicago	
	Female Juggler	Jongleuse	1930–1935	oil on canvas	55 x 33 cm	Paris	Musée d'Art Moderne de Paris	
	The Mirror	Le Miroir	1930–1935	oil on canvas	46 x 38 cm	Paris	Musée d'Art Moderne de Paris	
	Nude in the Sun	Nu au Soleil	1935	oil on canvas	162 x 130 cm	Paris	Musée d'Art Moderne de Paris	
		Nu aux hortensias	1935	oil on canvas	130.5 x 89.5 cm		Private collection	
		Allegorie	1935	oil on canvas	32 x 27 cm	Otterlo	Kröller-Müller Museum	
	The Bather, Nude	La Baigneuse, Nu	1936-37	oil on canvas	130 x 89 cm		Private collection	
	Yachting		1937	oil on canvas	116 x 80 cm		Private collection	
		La Rêveuse, Jeune femme assise dans une fauteuil	1938	oil on canvas	65 x 54 cm		Private collection	
	Reclining Figure	Nu Couché	1946	oil on canvas	54 x 73 cm		Private collection	
	Reclining Nude	Nu allongé	1945-50	oil on canvas	100 x 73 cm		Private collection	
	The Green Dress	La robe verte	c. 1950	oil on canvas	160 x 96 cm	Paris	Musée d'Art Moderne de Paris	
	Bust of a Woman and Still Life	Buste de femme et nature morte	?	oil on canvas	81 x 60 cm	Troyes	Musée d'art moderne de Troyes	

== Published writings ==
Jean Metzinger was a highly prolific painter. He was also a published writer and theorist, not only on the topic of Cubism (for which he was the first with Note sur la peinture, 1910), but on the arts in general, on other artists, such as Henri Le Fauconnier, Robert Delaunay, Pablo Picasso, Georges Braque, Albert Gleizes and Alexandre Mercereau. His writings are infused with references to science, mathematics, philosophy, politics, and culture. He was also a published poet. He left behind a number of personal letters and journal entries. The following incomplete list contains some of his important published works.

- Note sur la peinture, Pan (Paris), October–November 1910
- Cubisme et tradition, Paris Journal, 16 August 1911
- Alexandre Mercereau, Vers et prose 27 (October–November 1911): 122-129
- Du "Cubisme", written with Albert Gleizes, Edition Figuière, Paris, 1912 (First English edition: Cubism, Unwin, London, 1913)
- Art et esthétique, Lettres Parisiennes, suppl. 9 (April 1920): 6-7
- Réponse à notre enquête - Où va la peinture moderne?, written with Fernand Léger, Bulletin de l'Effort moderne, February 1924, 5-6
- L'Evolution du coloris, Bulletin de l'Effort moderne, Paris, 1925
- Enquête du bulletin, Bulletin de l'Effort moderne, October 1925, 14-15
- Metzinger, Chabaud, Chagall, Gruber et André Mouchard répondent à l'enquête des Beaux-Arts sur le métric, Beaux-Arts, 2 October 1936, 1
- Un souper chez G. Apollinaire, Apollinaire, Paris, 1946
- Ecluses, Preface par Henri Charpentier, Paris: G.L. Arlaud, 1947
- 1912-1946, Afterword to reprint of Du "Cubisme" by A. Gleizes and J. Metzinger, pp. 75–79, Paris, Compagnie française des Arts Graphiques, 1947
- Le Cubisme apporta à Gleizes le moyen d'écrire l'espace, Arts spectacles, no. 418, 3–9, July 1953
- Structures de peinture, Structure de l'esprit, Hommage à Albert Gleizes, with essays, statements and fragments of works by Gleizes, Metzinger, André Beaudin, Gino Severini, et al., Lyons, Atelier de la Rose, 1954
- Suzanne Phocas, Paris, Galerie de l'Institut, February 1955
- Le Cubisme était né, Souvenirs, Chambéry, Editions Présence, 1972
