= The Harbor =

Painting by Jean Metzinger

- Le Port (French)
- Artist: Jean Metzinger
- Year: 1911–12
- Type: Black and white reproduction (1912)
- Medium: Painting
- Dimensions: Unknown
- Location: Whereabouts unknown

The Harbor (French: Le Port, also known as The Port or simply Marine), is a painting by the French artist Jean Metzinger. The work was exhibited in the spring of 1912 at the Salon des Indépendants in Paris, and at the Salon de La Section d'Or, Galerie La Boétie, October 1912, Paris, (no. 117 of the catalogue, entitled Marine, collection Mme L. Ricou). Le Port was reproduced a few months later in the first major text on Cubism entitled Du "Cubisme", written in 1912 by Jean Metzinger and Albert Gleizes, published by Eugène Figuière Editeurs the same year. The Harbor was subsequently reproduced in The Cubist Painters, Aesthetic Meditations (Les Peintres cubistes, Méditations Esthétiques), written by Guillaume Apollinaire, published by Figuière in 1913 (collection Mme L. Ricou). At the Salon des Indépendants of 1912, Apollinaire had noticed the classical Ingresque qualities of Metzinger's Le Port, and suggested that it deserved to be hung in the Musée du Luxembourg's modern art collection. The dimensions and current whereabouts of Le Port are unknown.

== Description ==
Le Port, probably an oil on canvas, depicts a complex harbor scene with sailboats, surrounding buildings and shuttered windows. On the distant horizon can be seen two larger boats; the one on the right perhaps a steam ship, the other with a large mast. Here Metzinger is almost exclusively concerned with principles of pictorial construction: the interplay of horizontals, diagonals, verticals and curves. The horizon is curved spherically.

Rather than depicting The Harbor from one classical point of view, Metzinger has used a 'mobile perspective' to portray the subject from a variety of locations and from different angles at various moments in time. The images captured from multiple spatial view-points and at successive time intervals are all shown simultaneously on one canvas.

Metzinger and Gleizes wrote with reference to non-Euclidean geometry in Du "Cubisme", the manifesto in which The Harbor was selected, amongst other paintings, to represent the Cubist methodology. It was argued in the text that Cubism itself was not based on any geometrical theory but that non-Euclidean geometry corresponded better than classical Euclidean geometry to what the Cubsists were doing. The essential was in the understanding of space other than by the classical method of perspective.

The topology chosen for The Harbor resembles that of a higher-dimensional Riemannian manifold, as opposed to a standard Euclidean 3-space. This is a space of constant positive Gaussian curvature. The boats on the distant horizon are traveling a geodesic path of positive intrinsic curvature. All of the objects represented by Metzinger in this painting are embedded in the non-Euclidean Riemannian (or pseudo-Riemannian) manifold of constant positive Gaussian curvature. The surface depicted is neither locally or globally flat. But Metzinger goes further than the simple geometrical model of Gauss or Riemann by using the faceting of form associated with a robust form of analytic Cubism. In addition, each element or constituent of the painting partakes in the overall scheme of things subjectively, in each individual's mental realization (according to Roger Allard, 1910). Metzinger goes well beyond a non-Euclidean perspective with multiple points of view, beyond the technical innovations of analytical Cubism. He penetrates to its intellectual core: "an art capable of synthesizing a reality in the mind of the observer". (Daniel Robbins, 1985)

The reconstruction of the total image was left to the creative intuition of the observer. The spectator now played an active role in the Cubist process. The sum of the parts of which the painting is composed now resides in the mind of the viewer. The dynamism of form implicit or explicit in the quantitative and qualitative properties of the work, set in motion by the artist who chose the multiple view points, could be reassembled and understood in an interactive dynamic process.

"But we cannot enjoy in isolation" wrote the two principle theorists of Du "Cubisme", "we wish to dazzle others with that which we daily snatch from the world of sense, and in return we wish others to show us their trophies."

This reciprocity between the artist and the public is perhaps one of the reasons Metzinger felt the need to include elements of the real world into his paintings of the period, untouched by the wrath of total abstraction. "The reminiscence of natural forms cannot be absolutely banished; not yet, at all events" wrote Metzinger and Gleizes in 1912. Art, to them, could not "be raised to the level of a pure effusion at the first step."

== Salon des Indépendants, 1912 ==
At the 1912 Salon des Indépendants Jean Metzinger exhibited Le Port (The Harbor) and La Femme au Cheval (Woman with a horse) — Albert Gleizes exhibited his monumental Les Baigneuses (The Bathers) (no. 1347) — Marcel Duchamp's Nude Descending a Staircase, No. 2 was listed in the catalogue (n. 1001) but was supposedly withdrawn — Roger de La Fresnaye exhibited Artillerie (no. 1235) — Robert Delaunay showed his immense Ville de Paris (no. 868) — Fernand Léger showed La Noce — Henri Le Fauconnier, Le Chasseur (The Huntsman) — and the newcomer Juan Gris exhibiting in a major Salon for the first time, showed his Portrait of Picasso.

The art critic Olivier-Hourcade writes of this exhibition in 1912 and its relation to the creation of a new French school:

Metzinger with his Port, Delaunay with Paris, Gleizes with his Baigneuses, are close to this real and magnificent result, this victory comes from several centuries: the creation of a school of painting, 'French' and absolutely independent.

Roger Allard's reviewed the 1912 Salon des Indépendants in the March–April 1912 issue of La Revue de France et des Pays, noting Metzinger's 'refined choice of colors' and the 'precious rarity' of the painting's 'matière'. André Salmon too, in his review, noted Metzinger's 'refined use of color' in La Femme au Cheval and praised its 'French grace', while noting Metzinger 'illuminated a cubist figure with the virtues of a smile'.

These early researches into Cubism were, in the words of Albert Gleizes, 'neither an alchemy nor a system. They were just the normal evolution of an art that was mobile like life itself.'

== Related works ==
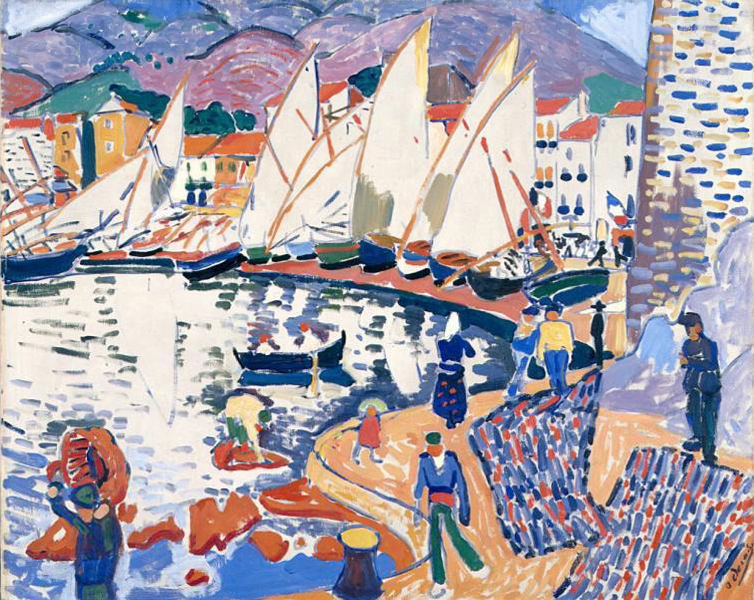
André Derain, 1905, Le séchage des voiles (The Drying Sails), oil on canvas, 82 x 101 cm, Pushkin Museum, Moscow. Exhibited at the 1905 Salon d'Automne

Georges Braque, 1909, Port en Normandie (Little Harbor in Normandy), 81.1 x 80.5 cm (32 x 31.7 in), The Art Institute of Chicago

Jean Metzinger, 1911–1912, La Femme au Cheval (Woman with a horse), oil on canvas, 162 x 130 cm, Statens Museum for Kunst, National Gallery of Denmark. Published in Apollinaire's 1913 Les Peintres Cubistes, Exhibited at the 1912 Salon des Indépendants. Provenance: Jacques Nayral, Niels Bohr

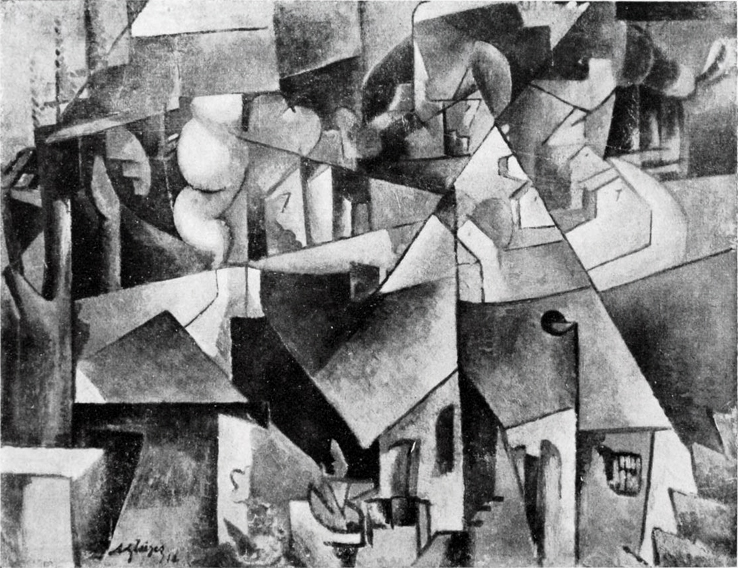
Albert Gleizes, 1912, Landschaft bei Paris, Paysage près de Paris, Paysage de Courbevoie, oil on canvas, 72.8 x 87.1 cm, missing from Hannover since 1937

== See also ==
- List of works by Jean Metzinger
