= Two Nudes =

Painting by Jean Metzinger

Deux Nus (Two Nudes)
- Artist: Jean Metzinger
- Year: 1910–11
- Medium: Oil on canvas
- Dimensions: 92 cm × 66 cm (36 in × 26 in)
- Location: Gothenburg Museum of Art; Gothenburg

Two Nudes (French: Deux Nus; also known as Two Women and Dones en un paisatge) is an early Cubist painting by the French artist and theorist Jean Metzinger. The work was exhibited at the first Cubist manifestation, in Room 41 of the 1911 Salon des Indépendants, Paris. At this exhibition the Cubist movement was effectively launched before the general public by five artists: Metzinger, Gleizes, Le Fauconnier, Delaunay and Léger. This was the first exhibition during which artists, writers, critics and the public at large encountered and spoke about Cubism. The result of the group show is a succès de scandale.

The following year Metzinger's Deux Nus, titled Dones en un paisatge, was exhibited at Galeries Dalmau, Exposició d'Art Cubista, in Barcelona, 20 April through 10 May 1912 (cat. 45). This was the first avant-garde art exhibition in Spain, and the first declared group exhibition of Cubism worldwide.

Judging from stylistic similarities with works such as Nu à la cheminée—exhibited in Paris at the Salon d'Automne of 1910—and the fact that Two Nudes was exhibited in the spring of 1911 (18 March – 1 May) at the Salon des Indépendants, the painting is believed to have been painted during the latter half of 1910 or the outset of 1911. Metzinger's Deux Nus (Two Women) is in the permanent collection of the Gothenburg Museum of Art (Göteborgs konstmuseum), Sweden.

== Overview ==
Metzinger, Nu à la cheminée, 1910

Metzinger, Deux Nus, 1910–11

Jean Metzinger appears to have placed aside his Divisionist style in favor of the faceting of form associated with analytic Cubism around 1908 or early 1909. A resident of Montmartre early on, Metzinger frequented the Bateau Lavoir and exhibited with Georges Braque at the Berthe Weill gallery. By 1910, the robust form of early analytic Cubism of Picasso, Braque and Metzinger (Nu à la cheminée, Nude, 1910) had become practically indistinguishable.

Instead of depicting the two nudes in the foreground, the rocks and trees in the background, from one point of view, Metzinger used a concept he wrote about for the first time in Note sur la peinture (published in Pan, 1910), of 'mobile perspective' to portray objects from a variety of angles, resulting in a multitude of image fragments or facets. In Two Nudes the models are captured from multiple spatial view-points and at successive intervals in time shown simultaneously on the canvas.

Art historian Patricia Railing writes of Metzinger's Two Nudes:

In Two Nudes, Metzinger has treated the human body, trees and rocks in exactly the same manner. They are differentiated only by size, or by emphasising planes, from which the Russian term, plos'kost, plane surface, comes directly from the French, surface plane (in distinction to the curved plane). Metzinger sees everything as cubic multiples with which he "builds", as it were, stacking them, interlocking them, and bonding them together. Thus he creates a total environment where figures and setting make up a pictorial unit. [...] Although not particularly apparent due to the haziness of the contemporary photograph of Metzinger’s Two Nudes, such a linear framework was the fundamental ordering principle of his painting and it can be seen clearly in his 1911 canvas, Tea Time / Le Goûter.

The similarity between Metzinger's work of 1910 and that of Picasso is exemplified in his Nu à la cheminée. Though less so in Two Nudes, both pictures merge the model with the environment, blurring the distinction between background and foreground. Metzinger, however—in contrast to the extreme faceting, simultaneous views and multiple perspective—has rendered his elegant nudes with grace; the tall and slender models expressing tenderness towards one another (with a hand placed on the shoulder).

Eadweard Muybridge, sometime between 1872 and 1885, Females (nude) animation showing two nude women kissing, Vol. IV, Plate 444

Jean Metzinger, 1910–11, Deux Nus (Two Nudes)

Mathematical and philosophical inferences known to have been essential aspects of Metzinger's work had little in common with the paintings of Picasso or Braque. Metzinger's interpretation targeted a wide audience—as opposed to private gallery collectors—exhibiting in abundance an underlying idealism, a temporal reconstruction of dissected subjects based on the principles of non-Euclidean geometry. These inferences were compelling because they offered a stimulating and intelligible rationale for his innovations—consistent with contemporary intellectual trends in literature; notably with the Abbaye de Créteil group and Bergson's philosophy.

In Two Nudes, Metzinger depicts motion, not of the subject matter relative to the observer as the Futurists would later portray, but by successive superimposed images captured by the artist in motion relative to (or around) the subject matter. The Chronophotography of Eadweard Muybridge and Étienne-Jules Marey. Muybridge's sequential photography of movements broken down frame by frame produced in the late 19th century depicting such as Females (nude), an animation showing two nude women kissing, were known in Europe at the beginning of the 20th century. Muybridge often traveled to Europe to promote his work and he met Étienne-Jules Marey in 1881. His freeze-framed images evoked time and motion.

== The 1911 Indépendants ==
Metzinger's Deux Nus is reproduced top right. Paintings by Juan Gris, Bodegón; August Agero (sculpture); Marie Laurencin (acrylic); Albert Gleizes, 1911, Paysage, Landscape. Published in La Publicidad, 26 April 1912 for the occasion of the first Cubist exhibition in Spain, held at Galeries J. Dalmau, Exposició d'Art Cubista, Barcelona

In the spring of 1911 the artists soon to be label Cubists made sure they were shown together by infiltrating the placement committee. Le Fauconnier's role as secretary of the salon facilitated the goal of hanging their works together. The result created a scandale. Until then, works hung in alphabetical order of the artists names. In Salle 41 were placed the works of Metzinger, Gleizes, Léger, Delaunay, Le Fauconnier and Marie Laurencin (at the request of Guillaume Apollinaire). In room 43 hung works by André Lhote, Roger de La Fresnaye, André Dunoyer de Segonzac, Luc-Albert Moreau and André Mare.

This exhibition, taking place in Paris at Quai d'Orsay, 21 April through 13 June 1911, involved more than 6,400 paintings. In room 42 was a retrospective exhibition of Henri (Le Douanier) Rousseau, who died 2 September 1910. Articles and reviews were numerous and extensive in sheer words employed; including in Gil Blas, Comoedia, Excelsior, Action, L'Oeuvre, and Cri de Paris. Apollinaire wrote a long review in the 20 April 1911 issue of L'Intransigeant.

Henri Le Fauconnier's Abundance, 1910–11 (Haags Gemeentemuseum, Den Haag), partly due to its large size and partly to the treatment of its subject matter caused a sensation. This painting was soon bought by the Dutchman art critic and painter Conrad Kickert (1882–1965), who was secretary of the Contemporary Art Society (Moderne Kunstkring). In 1934 he donated the painting to the Gemeentemuseum, Den Haag.

According to Gleizes, the public is outraged by the representation of subject matter as cones, cubes and spheres, resulting in the obscurity of the subject matter. The predominance of sharp geometrical faceting and the fact that a group of artists are all working in similar directions, gives rise to the term 'Cubism'. Although this and similar terms have been used before in artistic circles (usually in relation to the works of Metzinger, Delaunay and Braque), this is the first time the use of the term becomes widespread.

Metzinger’s Deux Nus stands among the most emblematic examples of the transformation Cubism underwent in this critical moment—a shift from formal austerity toward a richer, more humanized visual language. The presence of Metzinger’s canvas in Salle 41, the very space Apollinaire had declared as the locus of the new modern style, signals more than the participation of a key player. It announces a conceptual broadening of Cubism itself, away from a hermetic experiment in pictorial geometry toward a more accessible, emotionally resonant idiom—what Apollinaire called "the mark of the epoch."

Roger Allard, in his review of the 1911 Salon des Indépendants, writes of Metzinger and his Two Nudes:

Last year, Jean Metzinger caused an excessive degree of alarm. In carefully considering the canvas of his that caused the scandal ['Nu à la cheminée'], I found that the most daring possibilities were only barely indicated, and that one ought to be grateful to this poet for certain reserve in applying Mallarmism to painting.

In any case, the poetic, and hence instructive, feature of his art has since become sharper. I confess I am very sensitive to the precious charm that surrounds his two figures of nude women. This canvas exudes a real intimacy, thanks to the integration of the setting into the principal strokes, common in Vuillard, for example. (Roger Allard, 1911)

== Related works ==
Jean Metzinger, 1908–09, Baigneuses (Bathers), illustrated in Gelett Burgess, "The Wild Men of Paris", The Architectural Record, Document 3, May 1910, New York, location unknown

Jean Metzinger, c.1905, Baigneuses, Deux nus dans un jardin exotique (Two Nudes in an Exotic Landscape), oil on canvas, 116 x 88.8 cm, Colección Carmen Thyssen-Bornemisza

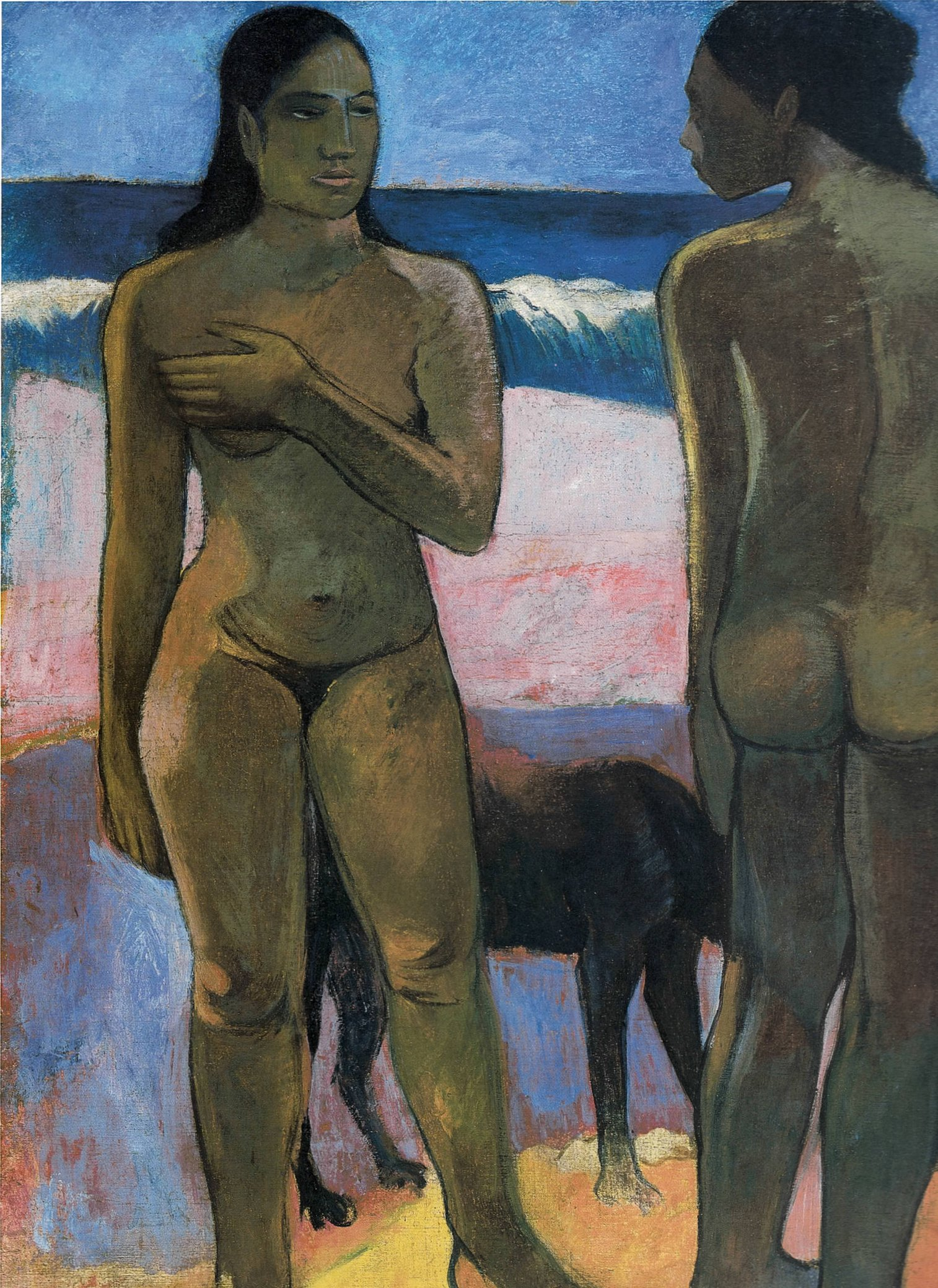
Paul Gauguin, 1892, Deux Tahitiennes sur la plage (Two Nudes on a Tahitian Beach), oil on canvas, 90.8 × 64.8 cm (35.7 × 25.5 in), Honolulu Museum of Art

== See also ==
- List of works by Jean Metzinger
