= La danse, Bacchante =

Painting by Jean Metzinger

- Artist: Jean Metzinger
- Year: c. 1906
- Medium: Oil on canvas
- Dimensions: 73 cm × 54 cm (28.75 in × 21.25 in)
- Location: Kröller-Müller Museum; Otterlo

La danse (also known as Bacchante) is an oil painting created circa 1906 by the French artist and theorist Jean Metzinger (1883–1956). Bacchante is a pre-Cubist or Proto-Cubist work executed in a highly personal Divisionist style during the height of the Fauve period. Bacchante was painted in Paris at a time when Metzinger and Robert Delaunay painted portraits of one another, exhibiting together at the Salon d'Automne and the Berthe Weill gallery. Bacchante was exhibited in Paris during the spring of 1907 at the Salon des Indépendants (No. 3460), along with Coucher de soleil and four other works by Metzinger.

The painting was purchased by the art historian and collector Wilhelm Uhde and formed part of his collection until it was sequestered by the French government just before World War I. By 30 May 1921 Bacchante was owned by the French painter André Lhote. The painting appeared at the auction house Hôtel Drouot where it was presumably purchased by Kröller-Müller, and published in Catalogue of the paintings in the collection of Helene Kröller-Müller. The painting forms part of the permanent collection of the Kröller-Müller Museum.

== Description ==
La danse (Bacchante) is an oil painting on canvas with dimensions 73 cm × 54 cm (29 in × 21 in). The work represents a nude woman in a composition that contains a wide variety of exotic geometrized elements. Metzinger's bold use of color characteristic of his work between 1904 and 1907 is highly noticeable in Bacchante. His brushstrokes are practically all the same size but their directions and colors vary giving rhythm to the overall work. The depth of field is flattened; the foreground blending in with background components. The subject matter is classical—reminiscent of Jean Auguste Dominique Ingres (an artist Metzinger greatly admired)—yet its treatment is everything but classical.

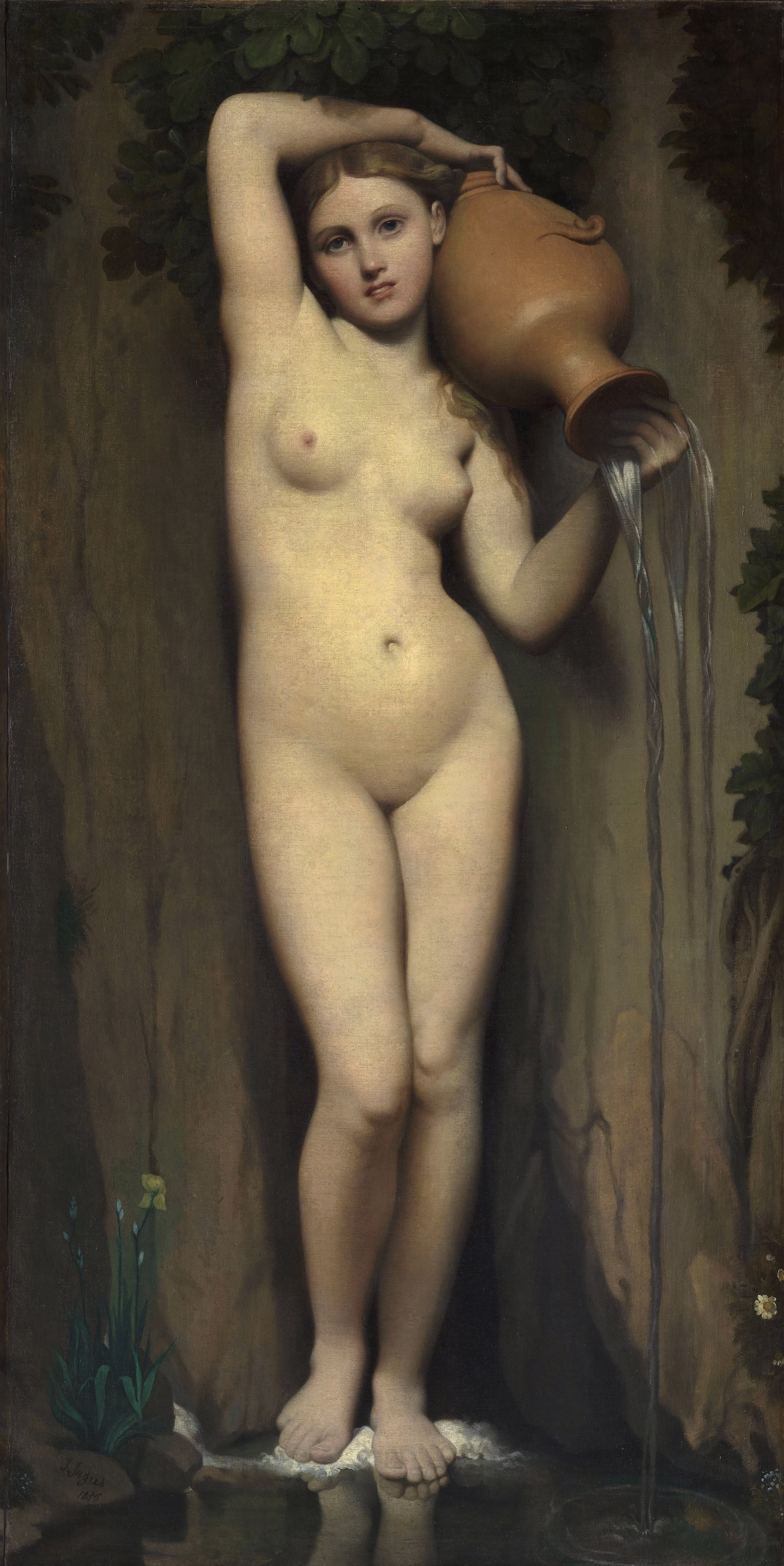
Jean Auguste Dominique Ingres, 1820–56, La Source (The Spring), oil on canvas, 163 cm × 80 cm (64 in × 31 in), Musée d'Orsay, Paris

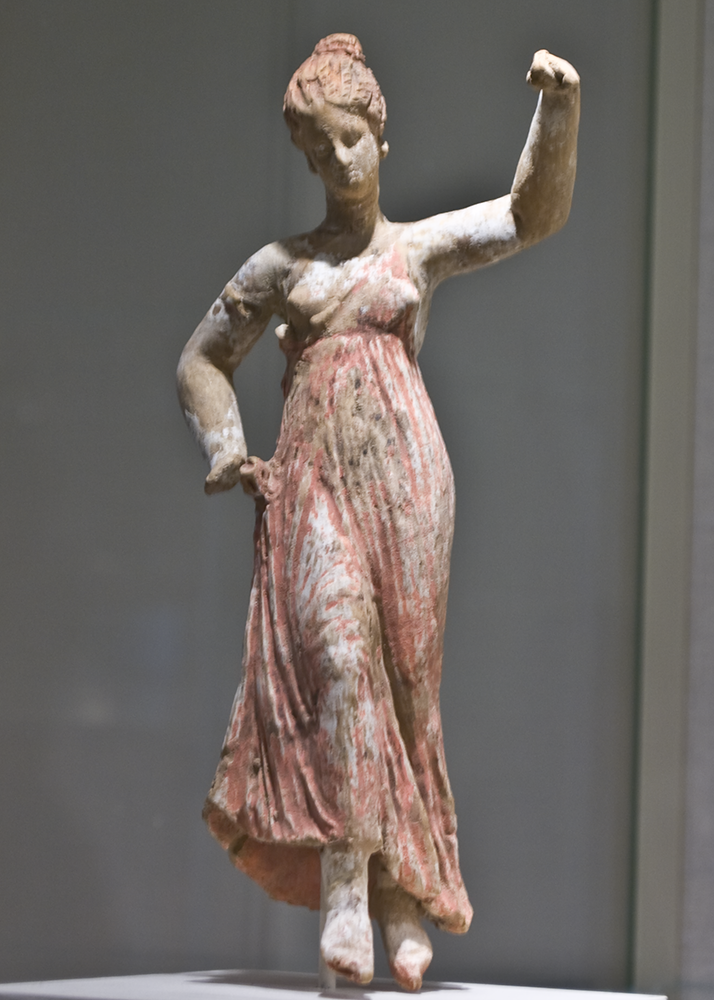
Ancient Greek terracotta statuette of a dancing maenad, 3rd century BC, from Taranto. Metropolitan Museum of Art, New York

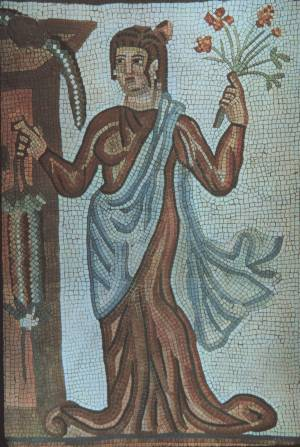
Perso-Roman floor mosaic detail from the palace of Shapur I at Bishapur, Iran

This early work in the Divisionist style represents a Bacchante (or maenads). In Greek mythology, maenads were the female followers of Dionysus (Bacchus in the Roman pantheon), the most significant members of the Thiasus. Their name literally translates as "raving ones". Often the maenads were portrayed as inspired by Dionysus (also known as Bacchus) into a state of ecstatic frenzy, through a combination of dancing and drunken intoxication. In this state they would lose all self-control, begin shouting excitedly, and engage in uncontrolled sexual behavior. Many artists chose this subject over the centuries, probably due to these dramatic characteristics.

Her body is depicted nude, seen from the front, with yellow and white highlights and turquoise reflections, the mythological reference serving as pretext for the nude. She is the primary subject of the work and is framed in an exotic setting that accentuates the arching curve of her back. She has a "deep voluptuousness," as in the works of Ingres (to use the term of Baudelaire), yet her timeless immobility makes her somehow chaste. The scene is seemingly calm and luxurious simultaneously.

Metzinger's early quest for a 'total image' explains the lack of illusory depth, the profuse light, and the refusal to depict a marked difference between the foreground, background and the woman's frame. Metzinger added a conspicuously tropical setting presumably under the influence of Paul Gauguin's Mahana no atua, Day of the Gods (1894) or Henri (lLe Douanier) Rousseau's Le Rêve (two more painters the artist greatly admired). Bacchante is already typical of Metzinger's style, with its sumptuous textures, sinuous harmony of line (for example the arching trees and foliage), and depiction of the serene attitude and chaste sensuality of the Bacchante's body—all enlisted in Metzinger's quest for absolute perfection.

== History ==
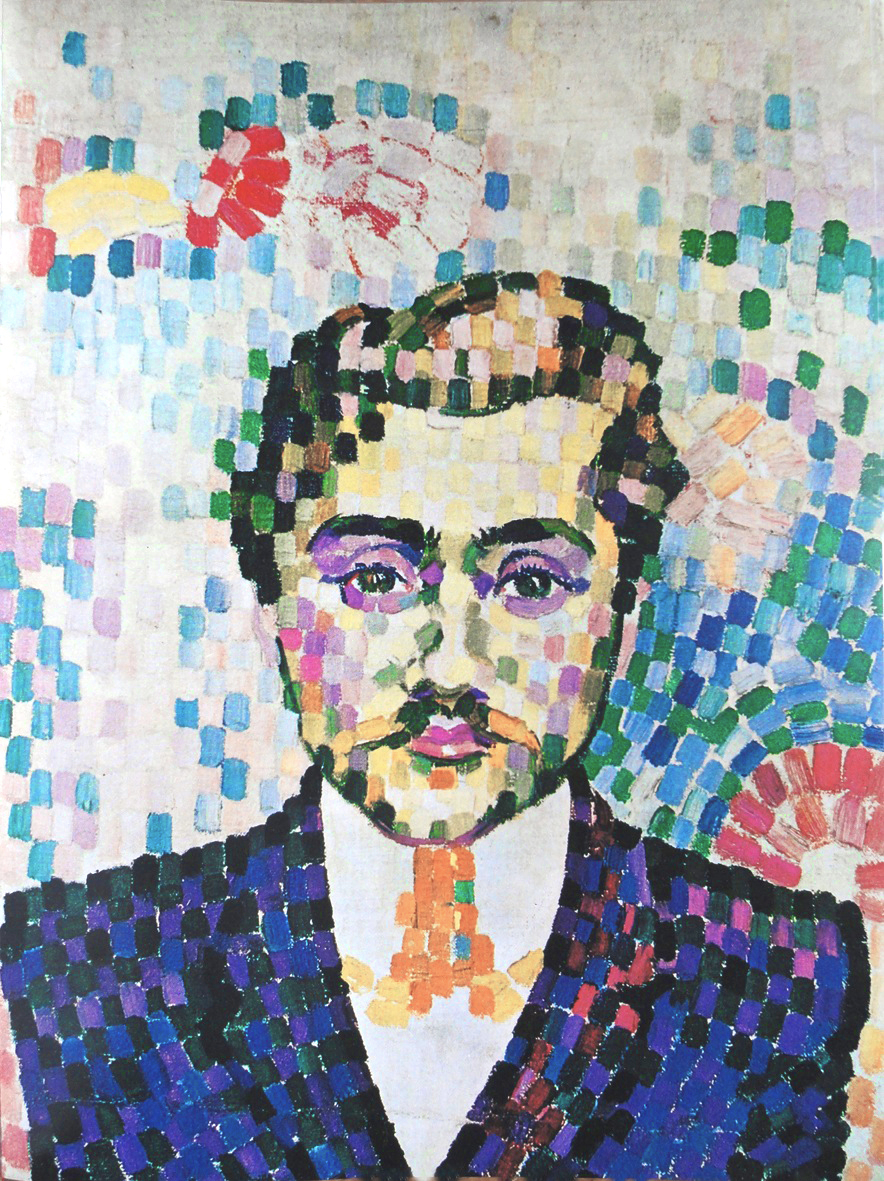
Robert Delaunay, 1906, Portrait de Metzinger, oil on canvas, 55 x 43 cm

Jean Metzinger, 1906, La danse (Bacchante); Pablo Picasso, 1909–10, Figure dans un Fauteuil (Seated Nude, Femme nue assise), Tate Modern, London. Catalogue Collection Uhde, tableaux modernes, aquarelles, dessins, Hôtel Drouot, 30 May 1921

In 1903 Jean Metzinger arrived in Paris (Montmartre) where he would reside until 1912. At this time he exhibited at the Salon des Indépendants and shortly after at the gallery of Berthe Weill, with Raoul Dufy (1903–1904), with Robert Delaunay (early 1907), with Marie Laurencin (1908) and later with André Derain, Georges Rouault, Kees van Dongen (1910). At Weill's gallery he met Max Jacob (1907), who introduced him to Pablo Picasso Juan Gris, and Guillaume Krotowsky, who already signed his works Guillaume Apollinaire. In 1908 Metzinger participated in a group exhibition at Wilhelm Uhde's gallery on rue Notre-Dame-des-Champs with Georges Braque, Sonia Delaunay, André Derain, Raoul Dufy, Auguste Herbin, Jules Pascin and Pablo Picasso.

In the spring of 1906 Georges Braque exhibited his works for the first time at the Salon des Indépendants. At the exhibition of 1907 six paintings by Braque were exhibited. Five were purchased by Wilhelm Uhde. The sixth work was presumably bought by the art dealer Kahnweiler. It was around this time that Braque first met Kahnweiler and was introduced to Picasso by Guillaume Apollinaire. Braques works were still Fauve in nature. It wasn't until the autumn of 1907 at L’Estaque that Braque began his transition away from bright hues to more subdued colors, possibly as a result of the memorial exhibition of Cézanne's work at the Salon d'Automne of 1907.

It is unclear exactly when Uhde purchased Bacchante, but it is probable that Metzinger and Uhde first met circa 1906, around the time Delaunay painted a portrait of Uhde in the same style as Metzinger's Bacchante.

At the outbreak of World War I, the possessions of many German nationals living in France were sequestered by the French state. Uhde's collection in 1914 included works by Georges Braque, Raoul Dufy, Juan Gris, Auguste Herbin, Marie Laurencin, Fernand Léger, Jean Metzinger (of which Bacchante), Pablo Picasso, Jean Puy and Henri Rousseau. These works were confiscated by the French state and sold seven years later at the auction house Hôtel Drouot in Paris 30 May 1921.

The Kröller-Müller Museum listed André Lhote in the provenance of this painting (Paris, 30 May 1921).

== Parallel to literature ==
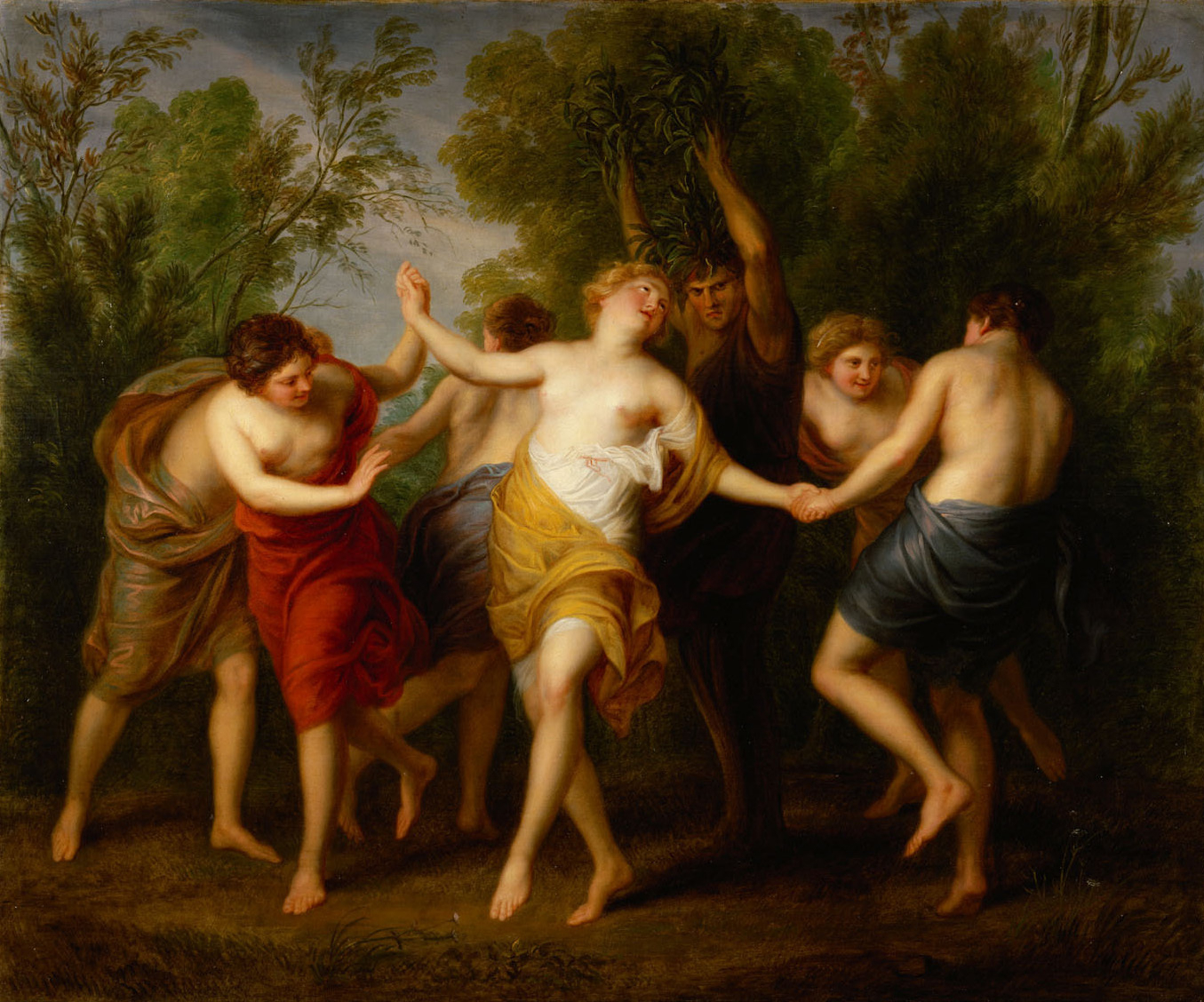
Andries Cornelis Lens, Dance of the Maenad (The transformation of an Apulian man into an olive tree), c.1765, oil on canvas, 100 x 118 cm, Kunsthistorisches Museum, Vienna, Austria

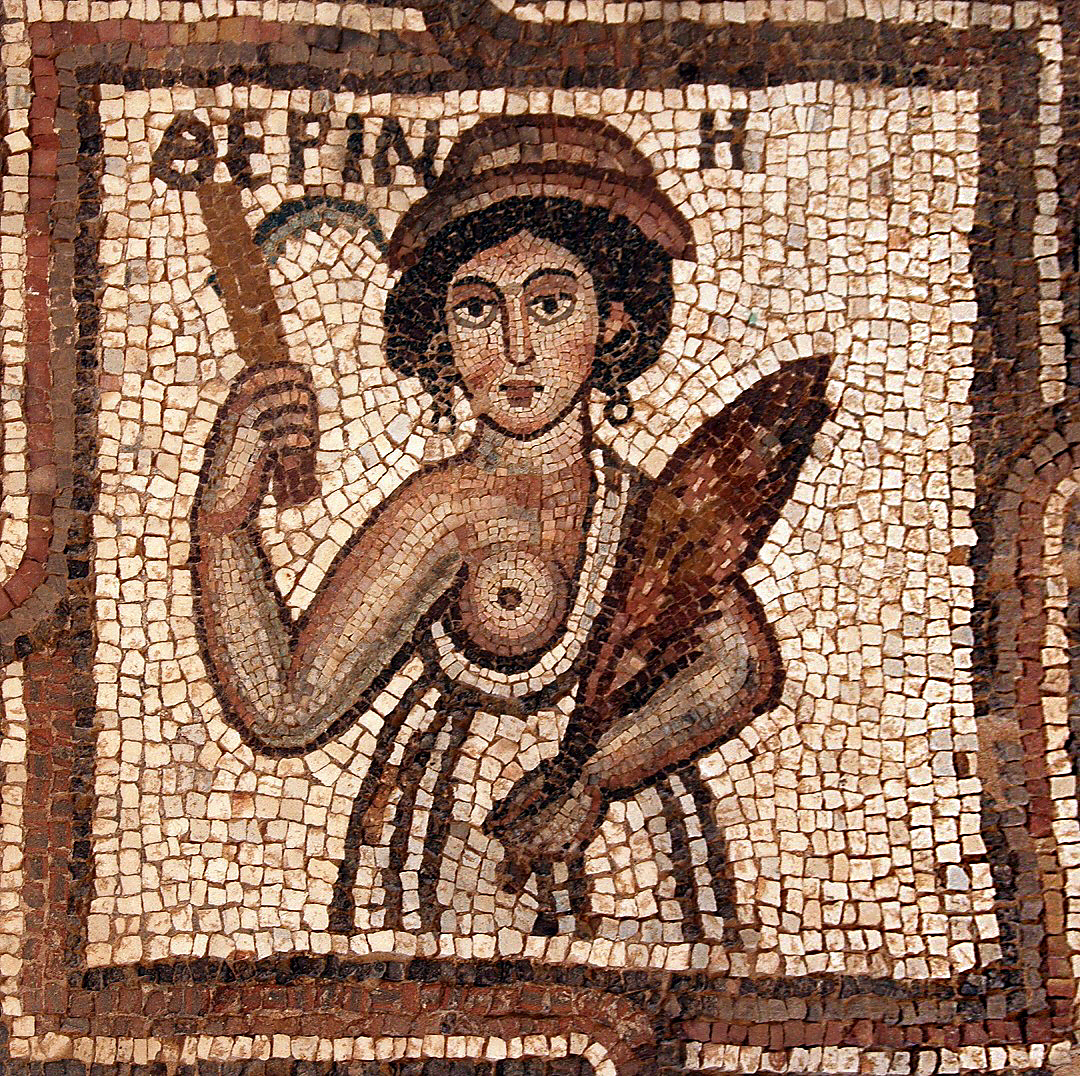
Byzantine mosaic (detail) Petra Church, Jordan

Jean Metzinger's 1905–06 Fauvist-divisionist technique had its parallel in literature. For him, there was an emblematic alliance between the Symbolist writers and Neo-Impressionism. Each brushstroke of color was equivalent to a word or 'syllable'. Together the cubes of pigments formed sentences or 'phrases', translating various emotions. This is an important aspect of Metzinger's work of this period, his proto-Cubist work, and an important aspect of Metzinger's entire artistic output (as a painter, writer, poet, and theorist). Prior to the advent of Cubism Metzinger coupled Symbolist/Neo-Impressionist color theory with Cézannian perspective, beyond the preoccupations of Paul Signac and Henri-Edmond Cross, and beyond too the preoccupations of his immediate entourage.

"I ask of divided brushwork not the objective rendering of light, but iridescence and certain aspects of color still foreign to painting. I make a kind of chromatic versification and for syllables I use strokes which, variable in quantity, cannot differ in dimension without modifying the rhythm of a pictorial phraseology destined to translate the diverse emotions aroused by nature." (Metzinger, 1907)

"What Metzinger meant" writes art historian Robert L. Herbert, "is that each little tile of pigment has two lives: it exists as a plane where mere size and direction are fundamental to the rhythm of the painting and, secondly, it also has color which can vary independently of size and placement." (Herbert, 1968)

Furthermore, each individual square of pigment associated with another of similar shape and color to form a group; each grouping of color juxtaposed with an adjacent collection of differing colors; just as syllables combine to form sentences, and sentences combine to form paragraphs, and so on. Now, the same concept formerly related to color has been adapted to form. Each individual facet associated with another adjacent shape form a group; each grouping juxtaposed with an adjacent collection of facets connect or become associated with a larger organization—just as the association of syllables combine to form sentences, and sentences combine to form paragraphs, and so on—forming what Metzinger described as the 'total image'.

"Artists of the years 1910-1914, including Mondrian and Kandinsky as well as the Cubists", writes Robert Herbert, "took support from one of its central principles: that line and color have the ability to communicate certain emotions to the observer, independently of natural form." He continues, "Neo-Impressionist color theory had an important heir in the person of Robert Delaunay. He had been a Neo-Impressionist in the Fauve period, and knew intimately the writings of Signac and Henry. His famous solar discs of 1912 and 1913 are descended from the Neo-Impressionists' concentration upon the decomposition of spectral light."

The height of Metzinger's Neo-Impressionist work was in 1906 and 1907, when he and Delaunay painted portraits of one another in prominent rectangles of pigment. In the sky of Metzinger's Coucher de soleil no. 1, 1906–1907 (Rijksmuseum Kröller-Müller), is the solar disk which Delaunay was later (during his Cubist and Orphist phases) to make into a personal emblem.

The vibrating image of the sun in Metzinger's painting, and so too of Delaunay's Paysage au disque, "is an homage to the decomposition of spectral light that lay at the heart of Neo-Impressionist color theory..." (Herbert, 1968) (See, Jean Metzinger, Rijksmuseum Kröller-Müller, Otterlo)

Metzinger, followed closely by Delaunay—the two often painting together in 1906 and 1907—would develop a new style of Neo-Impressionism incorporating large cubic brushstrokes within highly geometrized compositions that had great significance shortly thereafter within the context of their Cubist works. Both Gino Severini and Piet Mondrian developed a similar mosaic-like Cubo-Divisionist technique between 1909 and 1911. The Futurists later (1911–1916) would incorporate the style, under the influence of Gino Severini's Parisian works, into their 'dynamic' paintings and sculpture.

== Cubes ==
At the Salon des Indépendants of 1906 the elected members of the hanging committee included Matisse, Signac and Metzinger. Following the Salon d'Automne of 1905 which marked the beginning of Fauvism, the Salon des Indépendants of 1906 marked the first time all the Fauves would exhibit together. The centerpiece of the exhibition was Matisse's monumental Le Bonheur de Vivre (The Joy of Life). The triangular composition is closely related to Cézanne's Bathers; a series that would soon become a source of inspiration for Picasso's Les Demoiselles d'Avignon. Critics were horrified by the flatness, bright colors, eclectic style and mixed technique of Le Bonheur de Vivre.

Both Robert Delaunay and Jean Metzinger between 1905 and 1907 painted in a Divisionist style with large squares or rectangular planes of color (see also Two Nudes in an Exotic Landscape). Writing about the 1906 Salon des Indépendants, the art critic Louis Chassevent set the two apart from other Fauves and Neo-Impressionists. His use of the term "cube" to describe their work would later be taken up by Louis Vauxcelles to baptize Cubism. Chassevent writes:

"M. Metzinger is a mosaicist like M. Signac but he brings more precision to the cutting of his cubes of color which appear to have been fabricate by machine [...]".

The following year, Metzinger and Delaunay, with whom he shared an exhibition at Berthe Weill's gallery in 1907, were singled out by Louis Vauxcelles as Divisionists who used large, mosaic-like 'cubes' to construct small but highly symbolic compositions.

One and a half years later, November 1908, Vauxcelles, in his brief review of Georges Braque's exhibition at Kahnweiler's gallery, called Braque a daring man who despises form, "reducing everything, places and a figures and houses, to geometric schemas, to cubes.

This move towards a more geometrized form of Divisionism was critical in Metzinger’s evolution as an artist. His adherence to a mathematical division of space and form allowed for the flattening of depth perception—a key characteristic that would later be embraced by the Cubists. By 1905-06, Metzinger’s paintings, such as Two Nudes in an Exotic Landscape, already showed the clear influence of Georges Seurat’s geometric and linear structures, which would soon be taken up by the avant-garde, notably in the works of the Salon Cubists, but also in those of Picasso and Braque. The fusion of Seurat’s spatial divisions and Metzinger’s own vibrant, modular use of color and form created a new vocabulary, culminating in works such as La danse (Bacchante), that set the stage for the development of Cubist abstraction. Despite exhibiting with the Fauves, Metzinger’s approach to color and form remained distinct from theirs. His integration of geometry and an underlying structural approach made his work stand out as a bridge between the spontaneous color exploration of Fauvism and the more systematic, highly geometrized structures of Cubism. While Fauvism lacked a cohesive theoretical framework, focusing more on emotional expression through color, Metzinger’s work was driven by a clear philosophical and mathematical ambition that would soon evolve into a key component of early Cubism.

== See also ==
- List of works by Jean Metzinger
