= Football Players =

Painting by Albert Gleizes

- Les Joueurs de football (French)
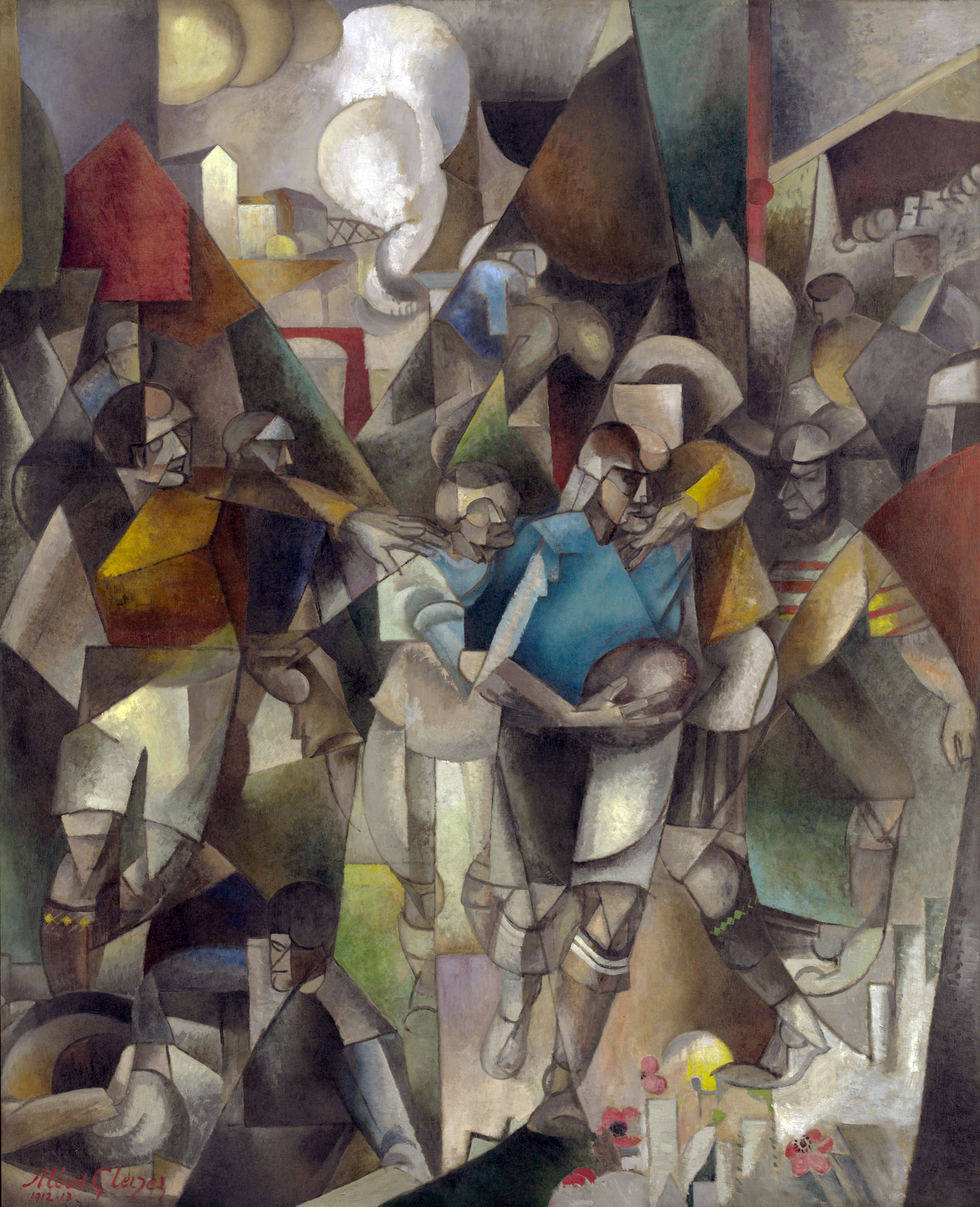
- Artist: Albert Gleizes
- Year: 1912–13
- Medium: Oil on canvas
- Dimensions: 225.4 cm × 183 cm (88.75 in × 72.04 in)
- Location: National Gallery of Art, Washington D.C.
- Accession: 1970.11.1

Football Players (French: Les Joueurs de football) is a 1912–13 painting by the French artist Albert Gleizes. The work was exhibited at the Salon des Indépendants, Paris, March–May 1913 (no. 1293). From September through December 1913 the painting was exhibited at Erster Deutscher Herbstsalon, Berlin (no. 147). The work was featured at Galeries Dalmau in Barcelona, 29 November–12 December 1916 (no. 31), Gleizes' first one-person show. The work was again exhibited at Galeries Dalmau 16 October–6 November 1926 (no. 7).

Stylistically Gleizes' Football Players exemplifies the principle of mobile perspective laid out in Du "Cubisme", written by himself and French painter Jean Metzinger. Guillaume Apollinaire wrote about Les Joueurs de football in an article titled "Le Salon des indépendants", published in L'Intransigeant, 18 March 1913, and again in "A travers le Salon des indépendants", published in Montjoie!, Numéro Spécial, 18 March 1913.

== Description ==
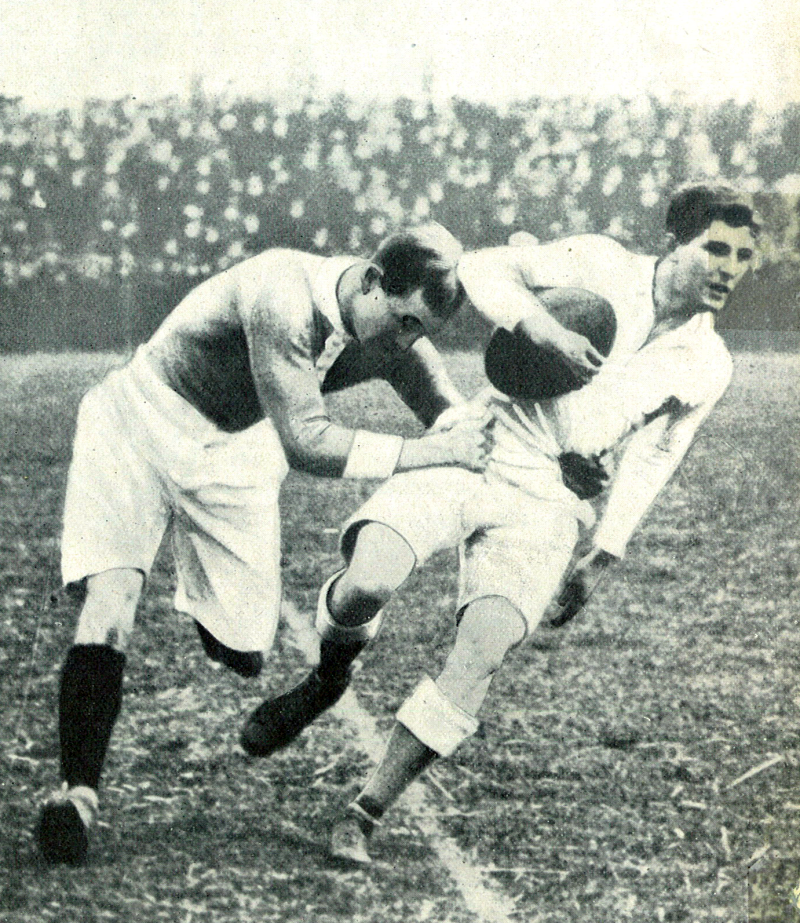
Cyrile Lowe being tackled by Jacques Dedet in the 1913 France–England match.

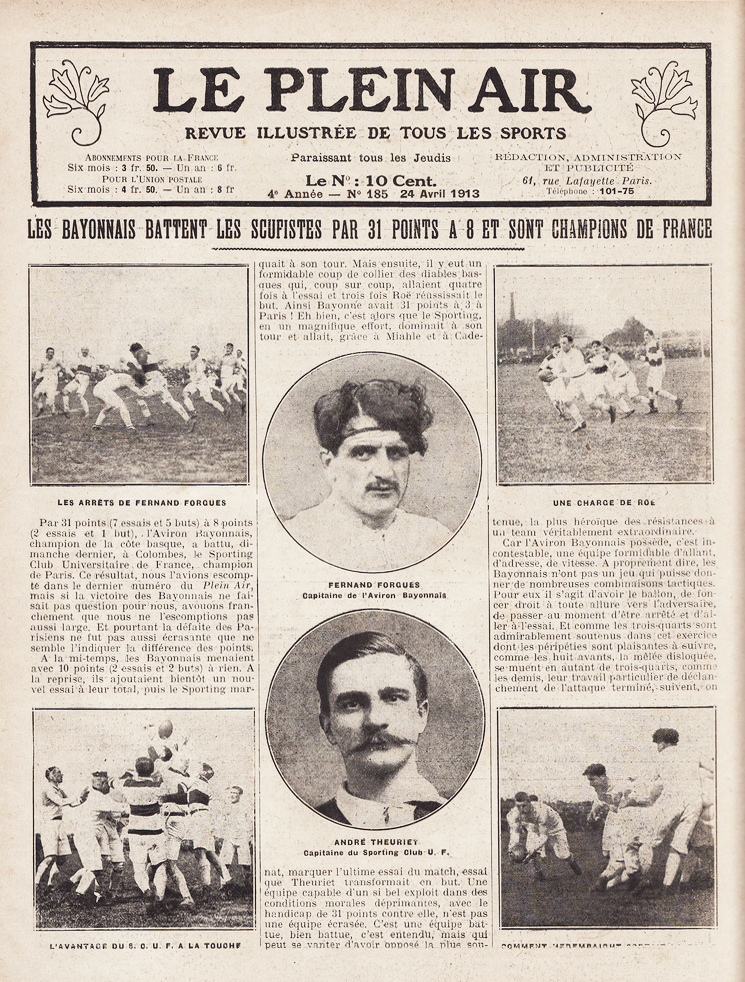
Le Plein Air, Revue illustrée de tous les sports, 24 April 1913

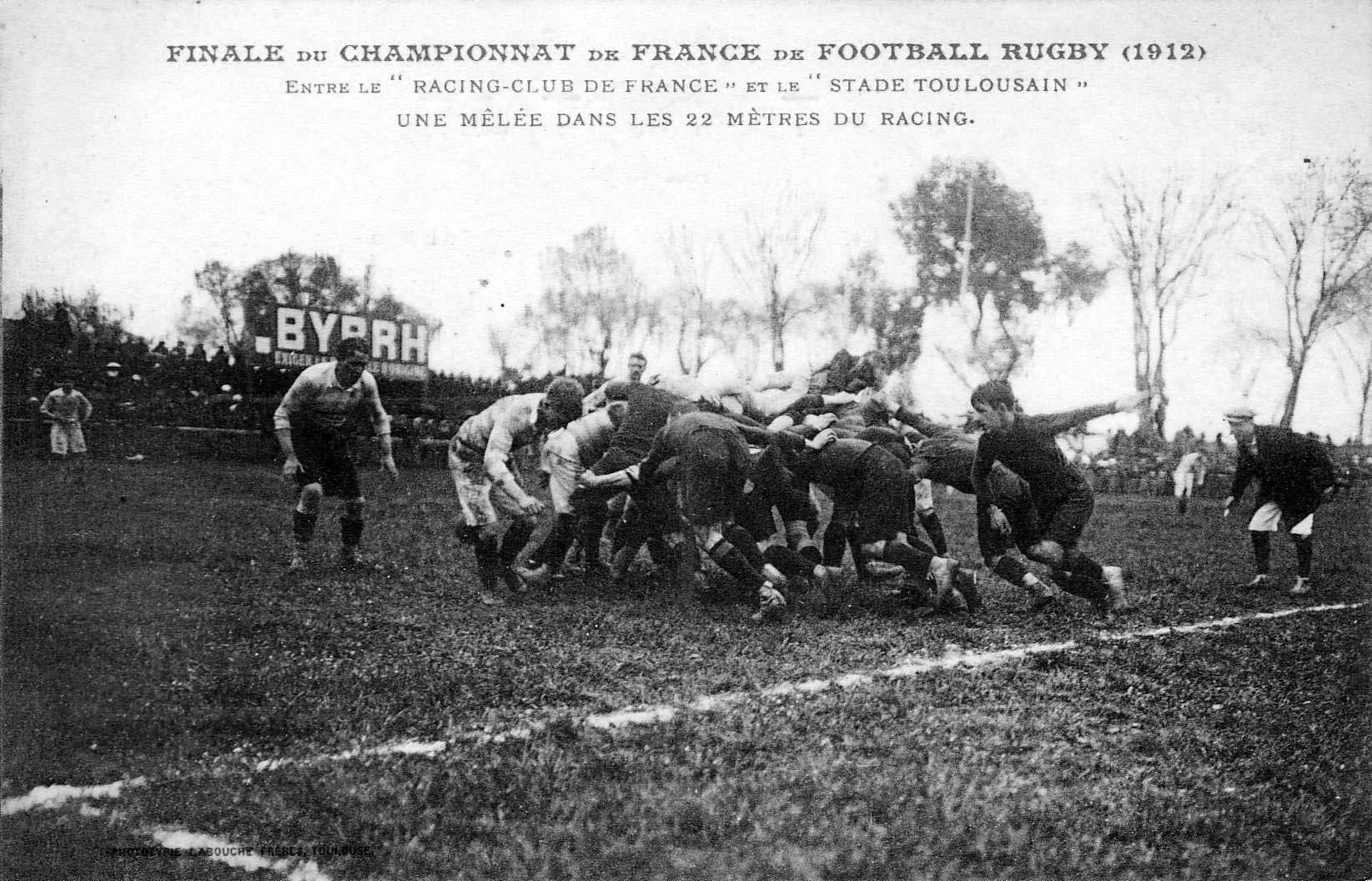
Final of the Championnat de France of rugby football (1912) between Racing club de France and Stade toulousain – "a melée at the 22 meters of racing."

Les Joueurs de football is an oil painting on canvas with dimensions 225.4 x 183 cm (88 3/4 x 72 1/16 in.) signed and dated "Albert Gleizes 1912–13" at the lower left.

After at least one preliminary sketch, Gleizes began working on this painting in 1912 and finished it before exhibiting the work at the Salon des Indépendants, March 1913.

Moving away from his quasi-monochromatic works of 1910 and 1911, Gleizes employed a wide array of primary colors, grays, earth tones and umbers.

Unlike the preferred subject matter of Pablo Picasso and Georges Braque (for example, still lives or guitar players), Gleizes has depicted a vast scene, combining a sporting event with a semi-urban or industrial landscape in the background.

As the principle subject matter of this work Gleizes chose to represent a group of six or seven rugby football players. The action and contact between the players is palpable. Two of the men are holding on to the player with the ball (blue jersey) as if a tackle is imminent. In contrast to the impending violence of the sport, Gleizes has painted flowers along with some cubic shapes toward the bottom right of the picture. On the bottom left is a man, possibly a fallen player, holding what appears to be a round shaped item in his hand. Spectators are seen toward the upper right, while to the left, in the background, Gleizes has painted a town, a bridge and bellowing clouds or smoke.

The rich juxtaposition of divers elements present within the piece are tied together in a Cubist idiom by an interlocking grid of diagonal lines, facets, intersecting plains and spheres.

== Overview ==
Painted during an ongoing debate over the virtues of Cubism and Futurism, Les Joueurs de football is a prime example of the artists desire to reconcile the problem of representing the subject from different points of view simultaneously, and/or in successive stages of motion (both the physical displacement of an object and the movement of thought). Here, according to art historian Peter Brooke, Gleizes explores the movement of subjects in motion "with the sense of movement that can be excited in the spectator using purely pictorial means". Brooke continues, "The drama can be seen very clearly expressed in Gleizes's painting Les Joueurs de football, in which a very powerful pictorial construction is undermined by the idea of aggressive movement, very rare for Gleizes, conveyed in the frozen gestures of the subject, the football players".

Guillaume Apollinaire writes in Montjoie! on 18 March 1913:

With his Joueurs de football, Albert Gleizes taken an enormous step. This is his most varied and most colored canvas. I still see in the upper section some unpleasant and heavy smoke, but the composition is new, divers. Gleizes embarked upon a challenging composition that he masterfully arranged. The subject has returned to the painting and I’m not in the least proud to have predicted the return of what constitutes very foundation of pictorial art. This Élan vital constitutes the subject of Gleizes' canvas.

L’Oiseau bleu, the large poetic composition by Metzinger is the most important work painted by this much discussed artist. It is difficult to express in a few lines and without prior meditation all the invention, all the marvel [féérie] of this well painted work.

We can no longer say, now, that Cubism is obscure [triste], gala rather, grand [noblesse], measure [mesure] and audacity.

Les Joueurs de football represents the close association of two artists, Metzinger and Gleizes, and to their shared social, cultural and philosophical convictions: The two artists worked with a mindset that painting represented more than a glimpse of the world in which they lived, and that a more complete perception of such would emerge by showing multiple facets of a single image with concurrent intervals.

We feared the dogmas and hermetic ideas, destructive acts disguised as new constructions, before they appeared as we knew they would. Rejecting nothing, we sketched out a traditional curve in French painting from Courbet to ourselves as the latest arrivals, persuaded that the new order cannot be created independently of the permanent order. (Albert Gleizes, 1917)

Gleizes' Football Players exemplifies the principle of mobile perspective and simultaneity elaborated upon in the Cubist manifesto Du "Cubisme", written with Jean Metzinger. Football Players exemplifies, too, the general freedom of the artist to interpret the subject matter without producing photograph resemblance or ‘realistic’ portrayal of an object or event. For Metzinger and Gleizes, such a portrayal was simply an arbitrary convention. In the world of experience, things are not static, but in constant motion. Objects are rarely seen from one point of view, and the act of perception is systematically accompanied by a collection of emotions and thoughts. Life is not a 'purely retinal' experience.

== Rugby football ==
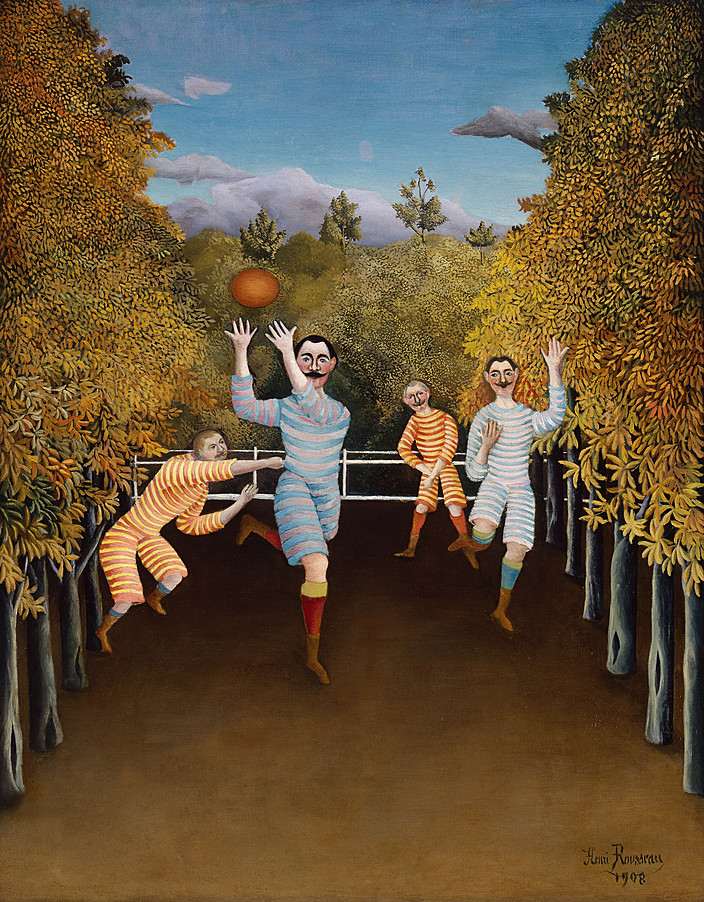
Henri Rousseau, 1908, The Football Players, oil on canvas, 100.5 × 80.3 cm, Solomon R. Guggenheim Museum

The apparition of The Football Players (1908) in the work of Henri Rousseau signaled the emergence of sporting events as a subject for art. Jean Metzinger painted At the Cycle-Race Track (Au Vélodrome) (1911–12) Peggy Guggenheim Collection; Umberto Boccioni, Dynamism of a Cyclist (1913), Peggy Guggenheim Collection and Dynamism of a Soccer Player (1913) Museum of Modern Art. Robert Delaunay worked on a series of rugby football scenes from 1912 to 1913, and again in 1924. André Lhote, later, painted the subject several times, between 1917 and 1937. In both the Gleizes painting and those of Delaunay, the identification with soccer has commonly been made, however, the ball is oval and the hands are being used; clearly identifying the subject of these works as depictions of rugby football games.

The first rugby competition was held in 1892 as a one-off championship game between two Paris-based teams, the Racing Club de France and Stade Français. In 1900 rugby was played at the Paris Summer Olympics. France won the gold medal of the first ever rugby event at the Olympics. Racing Club made it to the championship final on 31 March 1912. France joined an international competition in 1910, and coined the term Tournoi des Cinq Nations (Five Nations Championship); a term that would last almost the entire century. On 1 January 1913, at the France-Scotland match, spectators threw themselves on the referee to express their dissatisfaction. The mounted police were forced to intervene charging. This violent incident led to the secretary of the Scottish Rugby Union to declare: "If the game can only be played under the protection of the police or the military, it is not worth playing". Following this incidents, Scotland refused to face France at the 1914 tournament. France was implicitly excluded from further tournaments, but World War I did not permit the application of this exclusion.

The related sport-themed work of Rousseau, Metzinger, Gleizes, Delaunay, Boccioni (and later Lhote), reflected the enthusiasm for sport that fascinated the French spirit at the time. Romain Rolland described the Belle Époque generation as "Passionately in love with pleasure and violent games", in his 1912/13 novel Jean-Christophe. Art historian Daniel Robbins writes:

The role of team sport, especially in the context of mass audience participation, reflects another interest of the artists of Passy. Jacques Nayral was occasionally a sports writer (cf. L’Action Nouvelle, February 25, 1914) and a fan (as was Delaunay) of foot and bicycle racing. Gleizes' Football Players dates from the same year as Delaunay’s Cardiff Team.

== Related works ==
Jean Metzinger, 1911–12, At the Cycle-Race Track (Au Vélodrome), oil and sand on canvas, 130.4 x 97.1 cm, Peggy Guggenheim Collection, Venice

Jean Metzinger, 1912-1913, L’Oiseau bleu (The Blue Bird), oil on canvas, 230 x 196 cm, Musée d'Art Moderne de la Ville de Paris

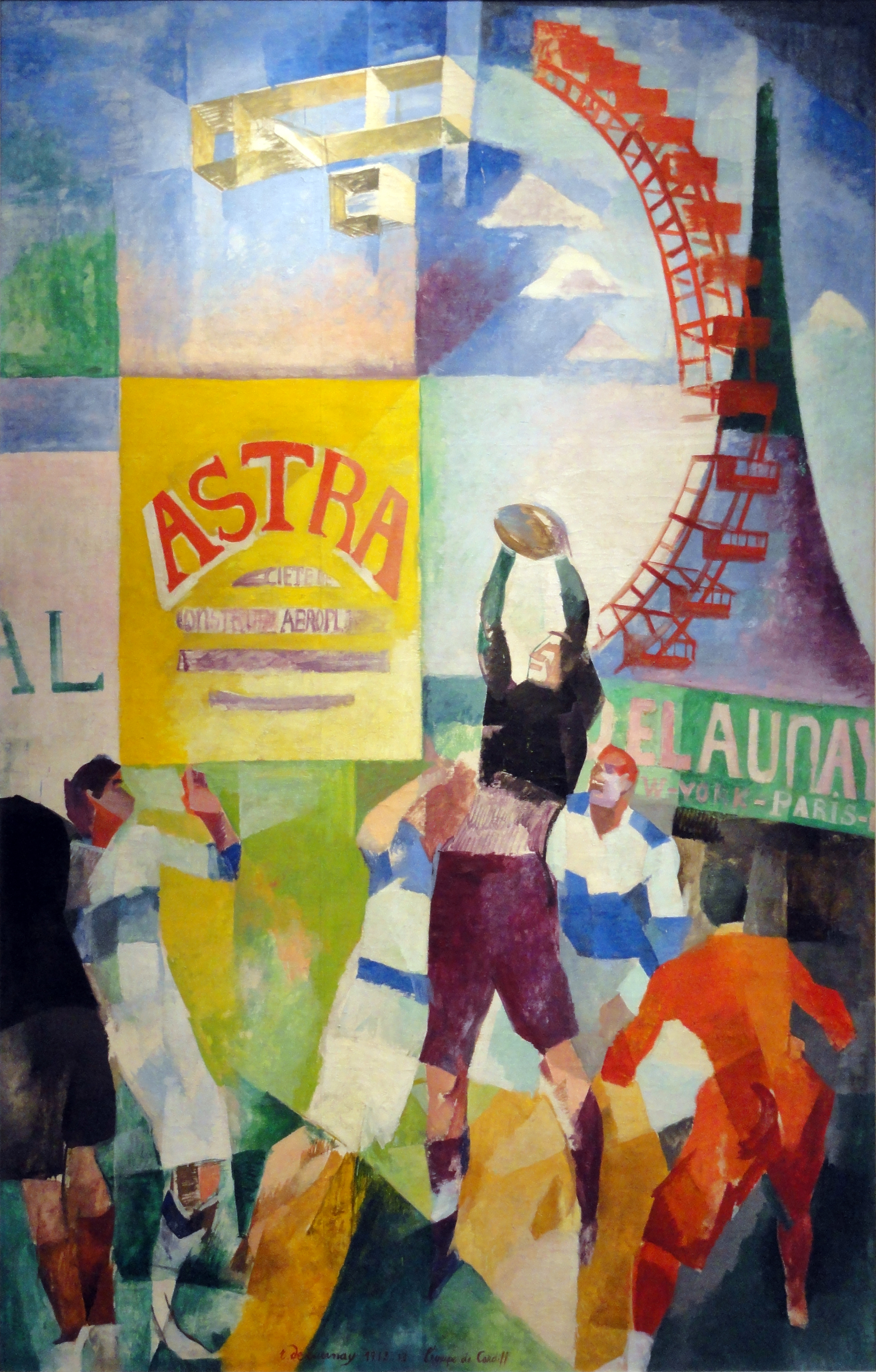
Robert Delaunay, 1913, L'Équipe de Cardiff, oil on canvas, 326 × 208 cm, Musée d'Art Moderne de la Ville de Paris

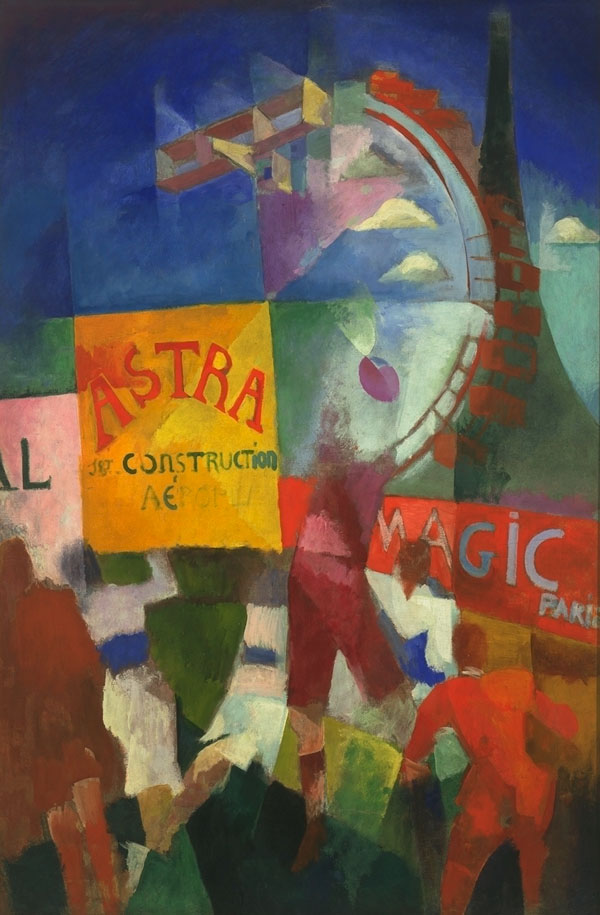
Robert Delaunay, 1913, L'Équipe de Cardiff, oil on canvas, 195 x 132 cm Van Abbemuseum, Eindhoven

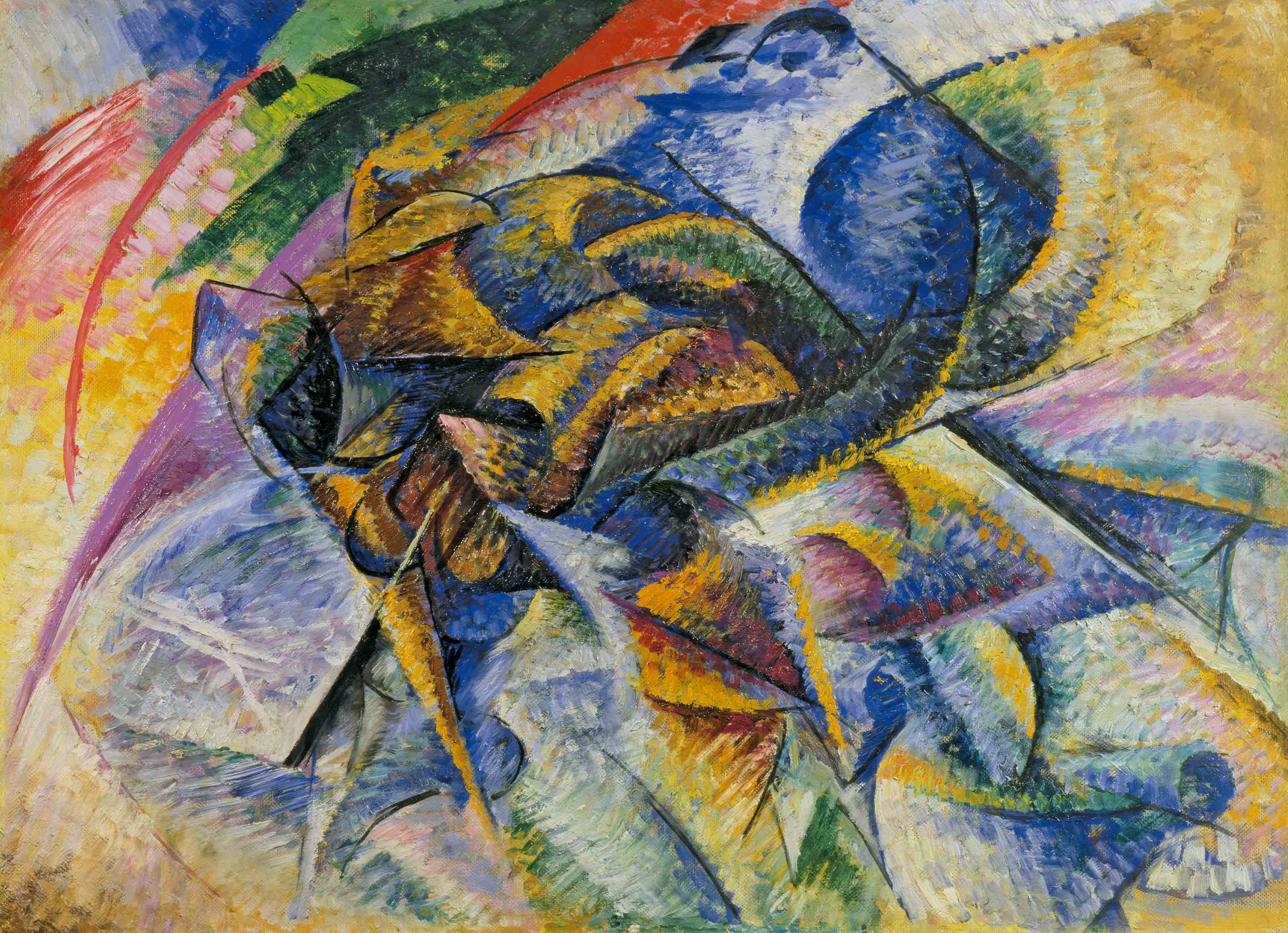
Umberto Boccioni, 1913, Dynamism of a Cyclist (Dinamismo di un ciclista), oil on canvas, 70 x 95 cm, Gianni Mattioli Collection, on long-term loan to the Peggy Guggenheim Collection, Venice

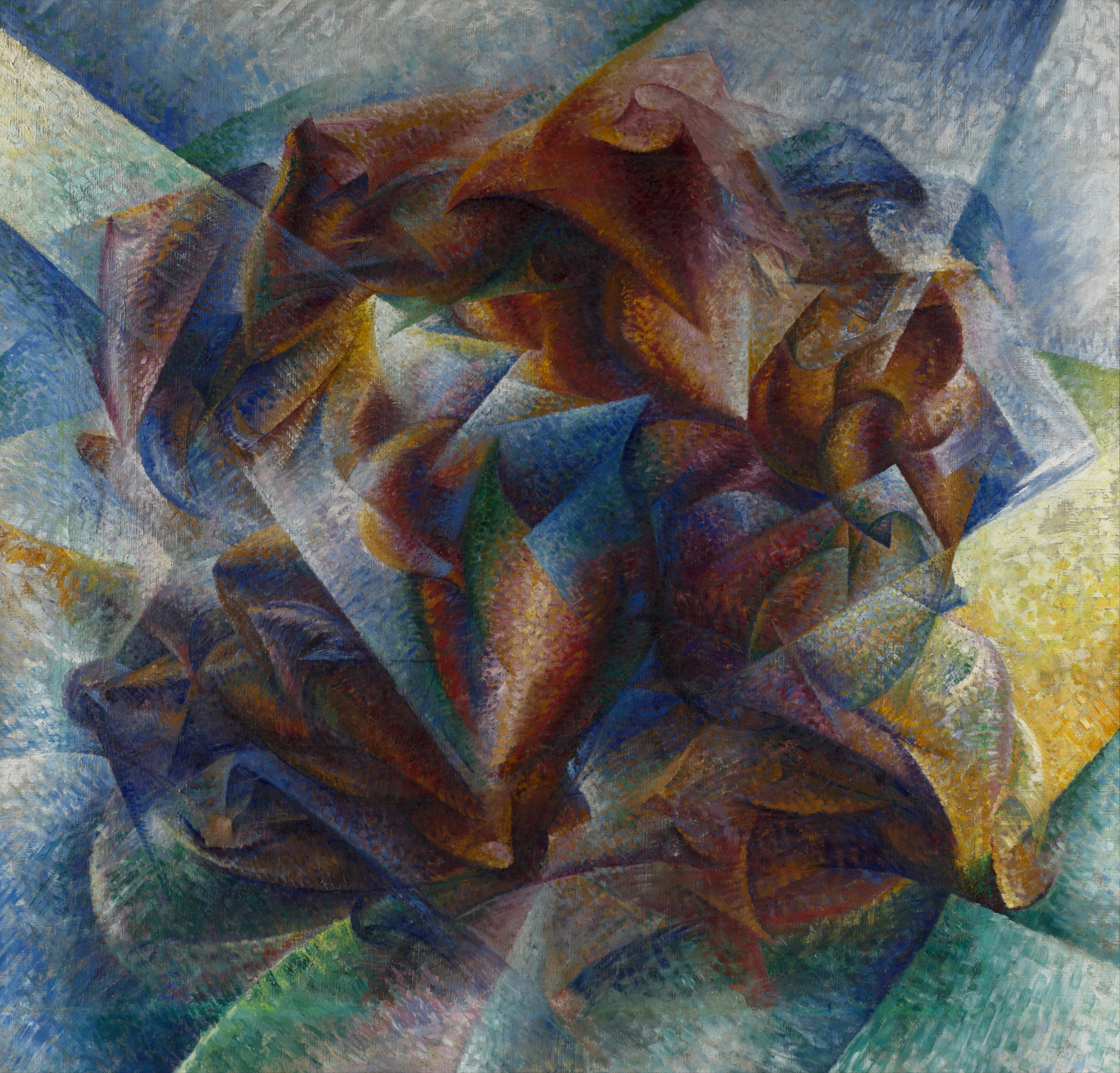
Umberto Boccioni, 1913, Dynamism of a Soccer Player, oil on canvas, 193.2 x 201 cm, Museum of Modern Art, New York

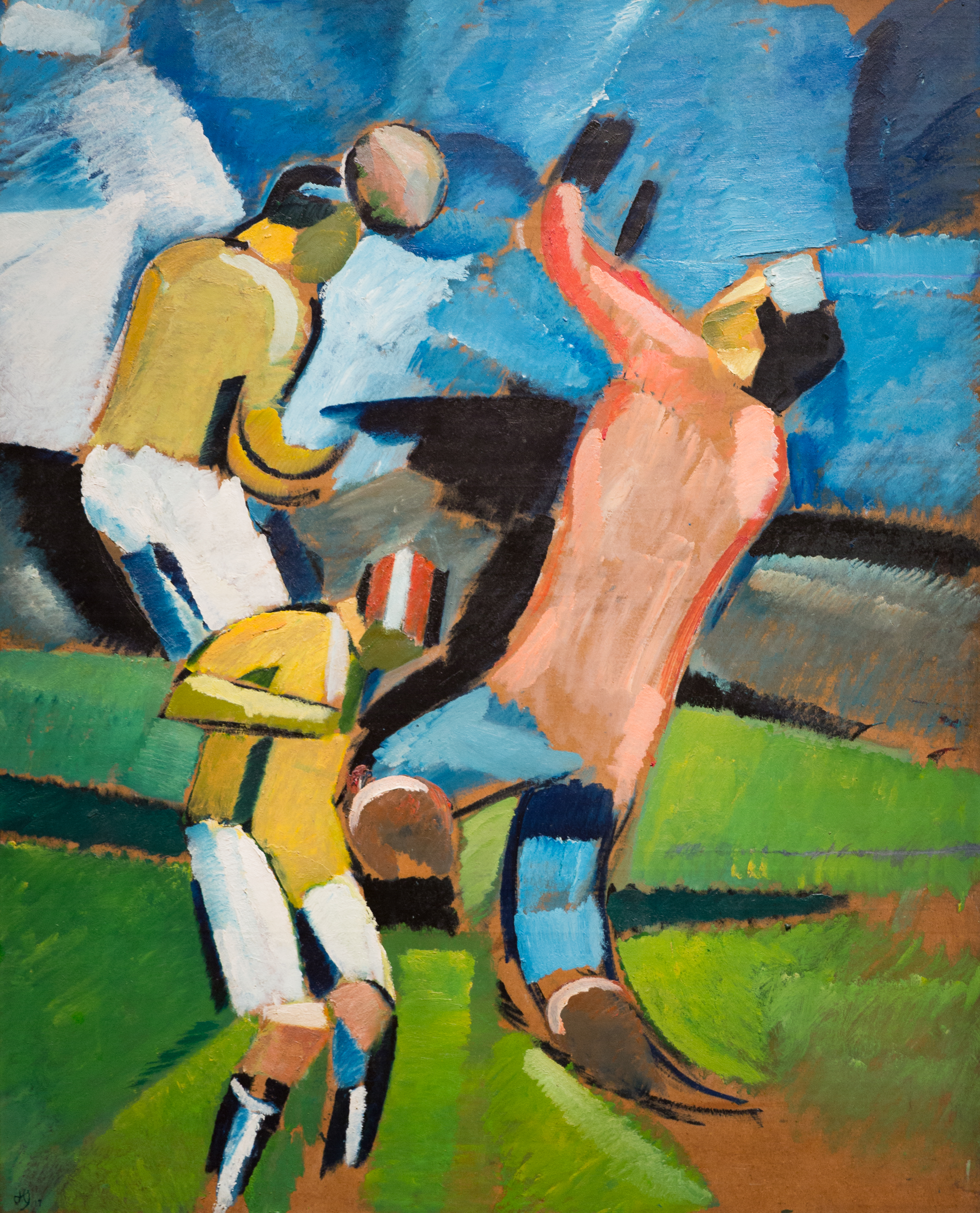
Harald Giersing, 1917, oil on compoboard, 149.1 × 122 cm, ARoS Aarhus Kunstmuseum

== Inscriptions ==
Albert Gleizes 1912–13, lower left; center right reverse: 25 nov[e]mbre 191[?]

== Provenance ==
Les Joueurs de football was left by the artist at Galeries Dalmau in 1916. Titled Jugadors de Futbol, the painting was reproduced in the avant-garde Catalan magazine L'Amic de les arts, November 1926. The caption included the inscription Collection Joseph Dalmau.

It was purchased from the Dalmau family between 1953 and 1955 by Stephen Hahn and (The Sidney Janis Gallery), then sold in 1955 to Nelson Aldrich Rockefeller, New York. Subsequently the work was sold to the Marlborough-Gerson gallery, New York, and purchased May 1970 by the National Gallery of Art, Washington D.C.

The details of the provenance are provided in a letter of 10 February 1970 from Daniel Robbins to J. Carter Brown. (There is a copy of the letters in the National Gallery of Art's curatorial files.)

== See also ==
- List of works by Albert Gleizes

== Exhibitions ==
- 1913, 29th Exhibition, Société des Artistes Indépendants, Paris, March–May 1913, no. 1293
- 1913, Erster Deutscher Herbstsalon, Berlin, September–December, no. 147
- 1916, Galeries Dalmau, Barcelona, 29 November – 12 December (no. 31)
- 1926, Galeries Dalmau, Barcelona, 16 October – 6 November (no. 7)
- 1955, New Arrivals From France, Sidney Janis Gallery, New York
- 1964, Albert Gleizes 1881–1953: A Retrospective Exhibition, Solomon R. Guggenheim Museum, New York; Musée National d'Art Moderne, Paris; Museum am Ostwall, Dortmund, 1964-1965, no. 40 (New York cat.) and no. 18 (Dortmund cat.)
- 1969, 20th Century Art from the Nelson Aldrich Rockefeller Collection, Museum of Modern Art, New York, unnumbered catalogue
- 1970, The Cubist Epoch, Los Angeles County Museum of Art; The Metropolitan Museum of Art, New York, 1970–1971, no. 98, pl. 63
- 1978, Aspects of Twentieth-Century Art, National Gallery of Art, Washington, D.C., 1978–1979, no. 14, repro
- 1988, Stationen der Moderne: Die bedeutenden Kunstausstellungen des 20. Jahrhunderts in Deutschland, Martin-Gropius-Bau, Berlin, 1988–1989, no. 3/18, repro
- 2001, Albert Gleizes: El cubismo en majestad, Museu Picasso, Barcelona; Musée des Beaux-Arts, Lyon, no. 37, repro.
- 2002, The Avant-Garde in Danish and European Art 1909–19, Statens Museum for Kunst, Copenhagen, 2002–2003, no. 24, repro.
- 2008, Le Futurisme à Paris: une avant-garde explosive, Centre Pompidou, Paris; Scuderie del Quirinale, Rome; Tate Modern, London, 2008–2009, no. 59, repro. (shown only in Paris)
- 2012, Der Sturm – Zentrum der Avantgarde, Von der Heydt-Museum, Wuppertal, unnumbered catalogue, repro.
- 2018–2019, Le cubisme, 17 October 2018 – 25 February 2019, Galerie 1, Centre Pompidou, Musée National d'Art Moderne, Paris. Kunstmuseum Basel, 31 March – 5 August 2019

== Bibliography ==
- L'Amic de les arts, Gaseta de Sitges, Any 1, núm. 8, November 1926: 3.
- 1972, Apollinaire, Guillaume. Apollinaire on Art: Essays and Reviews 1902–1918. Edited by Leroy C. Breunig. Translated by Susan Suleiman. New York: Viking Press, 1972: 282, 285, 292, 338.
- 1975, European Paintings: An Illustrated Summary Catalogue. National Gallery of Art, Washington, 1975: 154.
- 1975, Robbins, Daniel. The Formation and Maturity of Albert Gleizes: A Biographical and Critical Study, 1881–1920. Ph.D. dissertation, New York University. Ann Arbor, 1975: 113–114, 163–164
- 1982, Buckberrough, Sherry A. Robert Delaunay: The Discovery of Simultaneity, Ann Arbor, 1982: 167–171, no. 60
- 1985, European Paintings: An Illustrated Catalogue, National Gallery of Art, Washington, 1985: 179.
- 1998, Varichon, Anne. Albert Gleizes, Catalogue Raisonné, 2 tomes, Paris, Somogy éditions d'art/Fondation Albert Gleizes, 1998, no. 404.
- 1998, Pinkus, Karen. "Sport." In Encyclopedia of Comparative Iconography: Themes Depicted in Works of Art. 2 volumes. Edited by Helene E. Roberts. Chicago: Fitzroy Dearborn, 1998: 2:856
