= Tancrède de Visan =

French writer (1878–1945)

Tancrède de Visan (17 December 1878 in Lyon – October 1945 in Seyssinet aged 66) was the pen name of French writer Vincent Biétrix.

== Life ==
After studying at the College des Minimes in Lyon, Vincent Biétrix obtained a literature degree at the Sorbonne in Paris. Some time leading up to 1911, he attended the lectures of Bergson at the College de France and met regularly with the Cubists at the poet Paul Fort's soirees at the fashionable La Closerie des Lilas. He related Bergson's notion of "accumulated successive images" to the writings of Maurice Maeterlinck circa 1907, and in 1910 advocated the technique in Vers et Prose. But he gave up his studies at the Collège de France, and then contributed to various newspapers (Mercure de France, Revue du Temps présent, etc.).

He returned and settled in Lyon after World War I and from 1924 to 1939 was director of the magazine Notre carnet.

== Works ==
(selection)

- 1904: Paysages introspectifs, poésies, avec un essai sur le symbolisme, éditions H. Jouve, Paris, (LXXIX-152 p.) BnF 31593263d.
- 1908: Lettres a l'Elue. Confession d'un Intellectuel. Librairie Leon Vanier: Paris.
- 1908: Paul Bourget sociologue, Nouvelle librairie nationale.
- 1911: L'attitude du lyrisme contemporain : Francis Vielé-Griffin, Henri de Régnier, Émile Verhaeren, Maurice Maeterlinck, Paul Fort, Adrien Mithouard, Robert de Souza, Albert Mockel, Maurice Barrès, André Gide, Novalis, Henri Bergson, éditions Mercure de France, Paris. Reprinted in 2007, sous forme de fac-similé, par les éditions Eurédit, Paris, with a foreword by Paul Gorceix and preceded by Essai sur le symbolisme, 1 volume (CX-475 p.) ISBN 2-84830-098-1, BnF 411905408.
- 1910: Le Guignol lyonnais (with a preface by Jules Claretie), éditions Bloud, coll. « Bibliothèque régionaliste », Paris, (XII-104 p.), BnF 31593261q.
- 1922: Essai sur la tradition française, Rivière
- 1924: En regardant passer les vaches, éditions La Pensée française, Paris, (3rd edition), (368 p.), BnF 315932595.
- 1934: Perrache-Brotteaux (short stories), éditions Lugdunum, Lyon, (3rd edition), (319 p.), BnF 31593264r.
- 1936: Sous le signe du Lion (novel), éditions Denoël et Steele, Paris, (2nd edition), (277 p.), BnF 315932653.
- 1937: La vie passionnée d'André-Marie Ampère, éditions Archat, Lyon et Paris, (90 p.), BnF 40216475g.

Preface

- 1910: Louise Labé, Les Élégies et sonnets de Louise Labé (preceded by a notice by Tancrède de Visan), éditions Sansot, coll. « Petite bibliothèque surannée », Paris, (101 p.), BnF 32332100j.
