= Portrait of Jacques Nayral =

Painting by Albert Gleizes

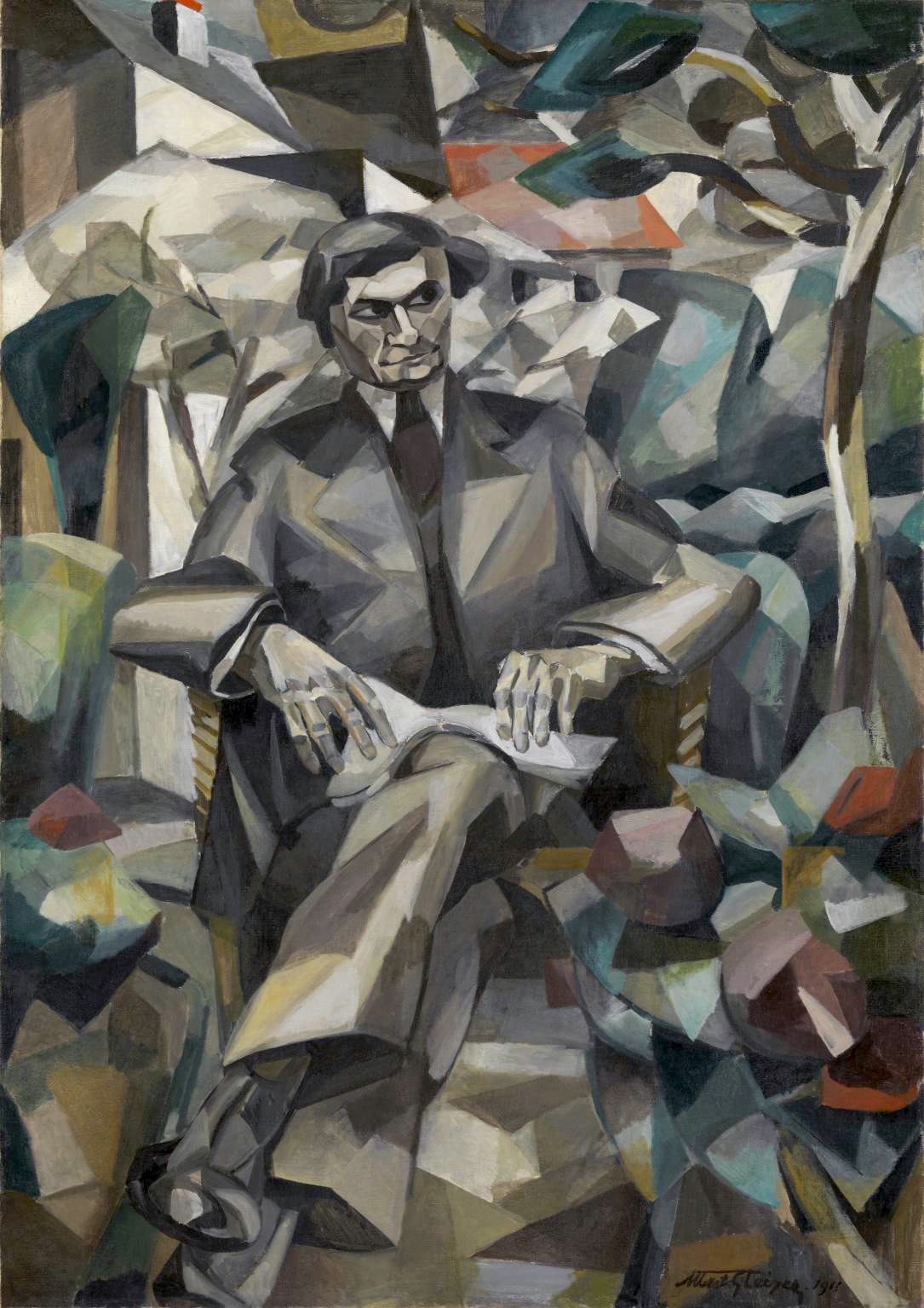
- Artist: Albert Gleizes
- Year: 1911
- Medium: Oil on canvas
- Dimensions: 162 cm × 114 cm (63.8 in × 44.9 in)
- Location: Tate Modern; London

Portrait of Jacques Nayral (also known as Portrait de Jacques Nayral) is a large oil painting created in 1911 by the French artist, theorist and writer Albert Gleizes (1881–1953). It was exhibited in Paris at the Salon d'Automne of 1911 (no. 609), the Salon de la Section d'Or, 1912 (no. 38), and reproduced in Du "Cubisme" written by Jean Metzinger and Albert Gleizes in 1912, the first and only manifesto on Cubism. Metzinger in 1911 described Gleizes' painting as 'a great portrait'. Portrait of Jacques Nayral, one of Gleizes' first major Cubist works, while still 'readable' in the figurative or representational sense, exemplifies the mobile, dynamic fragmentation of form characteristic of Cubism at the outset of 1911. Highly sophisticated in theory and in practice, this aspect of simultaneity would soon become identified with the practices of the Section d'Or. Here, Gleizes deploys these techniques in a radical, personal and coherent manner.

Jacques Nayral (a pseudonym for Joseph Houot) was a young modernist poet, dramatist, publisher and occasional sports writer, who shared with Gleizes a passion for the theories of Henri Bergson. He was a friend of Gleizes and married his sister Mireille in 1912. Gleizes began work on his portrait in 1910. The interfusion and interrelation between the sitter and the background of the painting reflect Bergson’s concepts about the simultaneity of experience. It was avant-garde works such as this widely exhibited portrait that fed the public outcry against Cubism. "Its scale echoes the large-scale paintings of the official exhibitions, while its style subverts that tradition". (Tate Modern)

Purchased in 1979, the painting is exhibited in the permanent collection of the Tate Modern in London.

== Description ==
Portrait of Jacques Nayral is an oil painting on canvas with dimensions 162 x 114 cm (63.8 by 44.9 inches), inscribed ‘Albert Gleizes 1911' (lower right). Studies for this work began in 1910 while the full portrait was completed during the late summer or early fall of 1911. The work represents an old friend of Gleizes, Jacques Nayral; the young author-dramatist who would marry Mireille Gleizes two years later.

Nayral was a partisan of the synthetic-social ideas of the Abbaye, editor-in-chief for the publishing house of Figuière and directly responsible for the publication of Du «Cubisme» as well as for Apollinaire's Les Peintres Cubistes, Méditations Esthétiques and the projected series Tous les Arts. The background of Portrait of Jacques Nayral depicts Gleizes' garden at 24 Avenue Gambetta in Courbevoie, the western banlieue of Paris. Stylistically this painting fulfills the direction established in the unfinished portrait of Mme. Barzun", spring of 1911.(Daniel Robbins, 1964)

Page from the periodical Fantasio, 15 October 1911, featuring Portrait de Jacques Nayral by Albert Gleizes and Le goûter (Tea Time) by Jean Metzinger

A page from the periodical Fantasio, 15 October 1911, features Portrait de Jacques Nayral by Albert Gleizes (1911) and Le goûter (Tea Time) by Jean Metzinger, juxtaposed with images of unidentified models, the man with his knees crossed and a book on his lap, the woman (clothed) holding a spoon and a tea cup, as if the sitters. The commentary by Roland Dorgelès is heavily ironic, with the headline reading Ce que disent les cubes... (What the cubes say...).

Jean Metzinger, Le goûter (Tea Time), 1911, 75.9 x 70.2 cm, Philadelphia Museum of Art. Exhibited at the 1911 Salon d'Automne. André Salmon dubbed this painting "The Mona Lisa of Cubism"

The complex forms that defined Metzinger's paintings of the period serve to suggest the underlying imagery (e.g., a nude, a horse, a dancer, a café-concert), rather than define the imagery; arousing the viewer's own creative intuition to decipher the 'total image.' This meant too, inversely, that the creative intuition of the artist would be aroused. No longer did the artist have to define or reproduce, painstakingly, the subject matter of a painting. The artist became to a large extent free, libre, to place lines, shapes, forms and colors onto the canvas in accord with his or her own creative intuition.

== Content and form ==
A similar concept lies behind Albert Gleizes' portrait of his friend, neo-Symbolist writer Joseph Houot, pen name Jacques Nayral, who in 1912 married Mireille Gleizes, the sister of Albert Gleizes. Along with Metzinger's Tea Time, Gleizes' Portrait of Jacques Nayral, painted the same year, exemplifies ideas and opinions formulated between 1910 and 1911 that would soon be codified in Du "Cubisme"; written in 1912 by Metzinger and Gleizes in preparation for the Salon de la Section d'Or, held in October. Du "Cubisme", published by Eugène Figuière, a close associate of Gleizes' friends Jacques Nayral and Alexandre Mercereau, was an attempt to bring together all the progressive tendencies.

According to Gleizes, both the content and form in this painting were the result of mind associations as he completed the work from memory; something that would play a crucial role in the works of other Cubists, such as Fernand Léger, Robert Delaunay and Francis Picabia. More so than an 'objective' view of the real-world, Jacques Nayral valorized subjective experience and expression. He and other Symbolist writers embraced an antirationalist and antipositivist world-view, consistent with concepts that underscored Cubist philosophies. Nayral's interest in philosophy led him to correspond with Henri Bergson, someone who would greatly inspire both Metzinger and Gleizes. Nayral's related interest in avant-garde art led him to purchase Metzinger's large 1912 oil on canvas entitled La Femme au Cheval, also known as Woman with a Horse (Statens Museum for Kunst, Copenhagen). Nayral's association with Gleizes led him to write the Preface for the Cubist exhibition at Galeries Dalmau in Barcelona (April–May 2012)

The Neo-Symbolist writers Jacques Nayral and Henri-Martin Barzun associated with the Unanimist movement in poetry. In his capacity as Figuière's editorial assistant Nayral had selected Du "Cubisme" and Les Peintres Cubistes, Méditations Esthétiques as part of a projected series on the arts. These writers and other Symbolists valorized expression and subjective experience over an objective view of the physical world.

Paul Cézanne's technique of passage, in the Bergsonian sense, was used by the Cubists to stimulate a presentiment, an awareness of the dynamism of form. "Between sculpturally bold reliefs", wrote Gleizes and Metzinger, "let us throw slender shafts which do not define, but which suggest. Certain forms must remain implicit, so that the mind of the spectator is the chosen place of their concrete birth. Let us also contrive to cut by large restful surfaces any area where activity exaggerated by excessive contiguities.

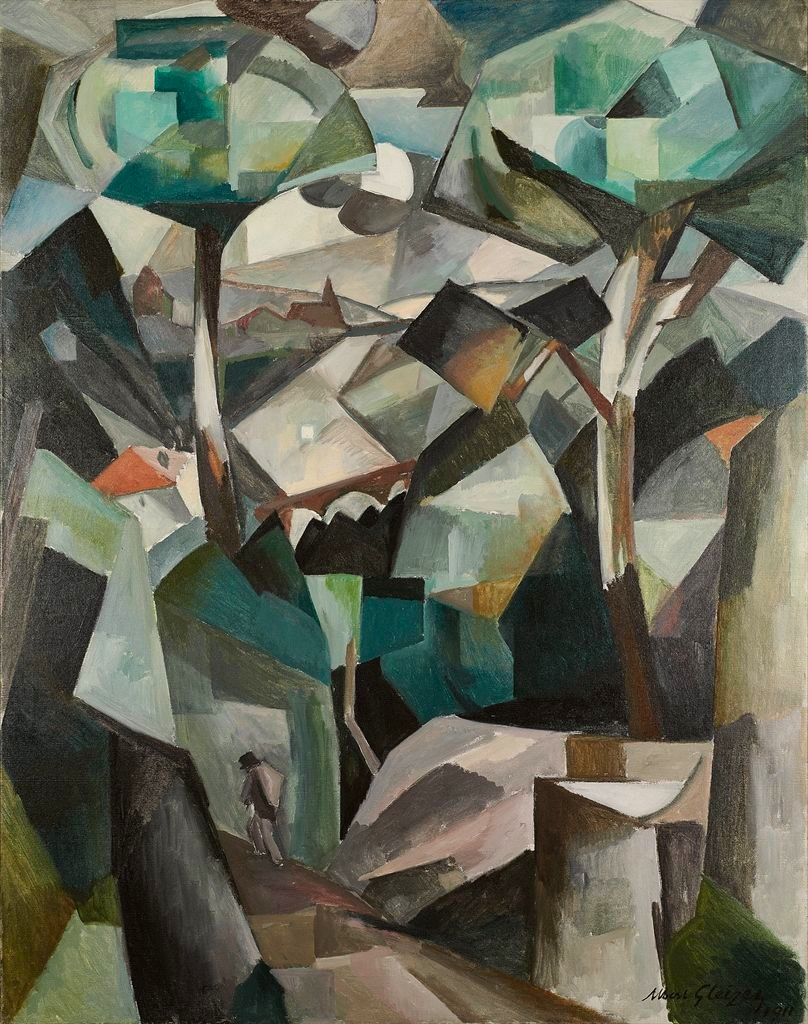
Albert Gleizes, 1911, Le Chemin, Paysage à Meudon, Paysage avec personnage, oil on canvas, 146.4 × 114.4 cm. Exhibited at Salon des Indépendants, Paris, 1911, Salon des Indépendants, Brussels, 1911, Galería J. Dalmau, Barcelona, 1912, Galerie La Boétie, Salon de La Section d'Or, 1912, stolen by Nazi occupiers from the home of collector Alphonse Kann during World War II, returned to its rightful owners in 1997

The dynamism of form resides in the unfolding response of both the artist and viewer to the quantitative and qualitative properties of the Cubist artwork. Metzinger's La Femme au Cheval (Woman with a Horse) (1911-12)—illustrated in Du "Cubisme" and owned by the poet Jacques Nayral—is structured according to these principles. The interplay of volumes, lines and planes has been 'abstracted' from the subject matter and spread throughout the composition. These complex geometric forms serve to 'suggest' the underlying imagery rather than to 'define' the subject, allowing the unity of the picture to be established by the viewer's 'creative intuition'.

In this portrait, Gleizes was interested in 'equivalences, echoes, interpenetrations [emboîtements], rhythmic correspondences with the surrounding elements—terrain, trees, houses'. He was delighted to paint a portrait of Nayral because his face corresponded well to the solid, faceted, architectural qualities he had sought.

In a departure from the static nature of single-point perspective, in his Nayral portrait, as in Le Chemin, Paysage à Meudon (1911), Gleizes simplifies, interpenetrates volumes, fuses the landscape with the model, to form a homogeneous picture. While volumes point is different directions and the subject is seen from several different angles ('multiple perspective') the observer still sees the entire surface of the canvas, preserving unity.

Nayral asked Gleizes to paint his portrait in 1910, a task the artist completed over the course of several months, coming to an end in 1911. For Gleizes, this portrait, much as Metzinger's Le goûter (Tea Time), exemplified concepts that were later codified in Du "Cubisme". In his autobiographical notes Gleizes suggests that the theory of intuition propounded in that text may have been pronounced as early as 1910 (during a Proto-Cubist phase).

== Gleizes on Nayral ==
I was on the verge of painting the Portrait of Jacques Nayral. He was to become my brother-in-law, and was one of the most sympathetic men I have ever met. A strange lad, a little surprising on first encounter - both disturbing because of his sharp use of irony and also attractive because of a generosity that left him as vulnerable as a child. The first time I met him was at President Bonjean's house at Villepreux-les-Clayes, near Versailles, during a dinner which brought together the committee of that 'Villa Medicis Libre' which, as I said before, had been founded by Alexandre Mercereau. From that time onwards, we saw each other often and became friends. [...]

One day he asked me to do his portrait. I agreed with joy, all the more so because his head and his whole personality [personne] seemed to me to be perfect models for emphasising the plastic elements I was trying to develop. His face with clearly demarcated surfaces that made up a passionate interplay of facets, his hair in dark masses projecting lightly in waves over his temples, his solidly constructed body - straightaway suggested to me equivalences, echoes [rappels], interpenetrations, rhythmic correspondences with the surrounding elements, fields, trees, houses. So I suggested painting him in my garden, where I found easily to hand an environment that was highly suitable for my model.

I made a whole series of studies to prepare this portrait. Drawings and washes in china ink. I analysed the architecture of the head in monumentally sized enlargements, two or three times the natural size, I made a certain number of drawings of the hands, I studied the organisation and the overall effect, volumes and the relations of the formal elements between themselves. Finally, I reduced the colour to a harmony of blacks and greys supported by some flashes of light red which set up a contrast, at once breaking with and supporting the interplay of harmonious colour relations. Nayral came regularly to the studio, I worked directly on him, naturally, but more often than not the work consisted in friendly conversation, in walks in the garden, during which I studied him, watching what was his natural way of walking and what were his usual gestures, above all arming my memory with essential characteristics, trying to isolate his true likeness from the accumulation of details and picturesque superfluities which always interfere with the permanent reality of a being. The portrait was executed without turning to the model, it was finished some weeks before the Automne and I decided to show it... if the jury would be willing to accept it, as I was not yet a member. (Albert Gleizes)

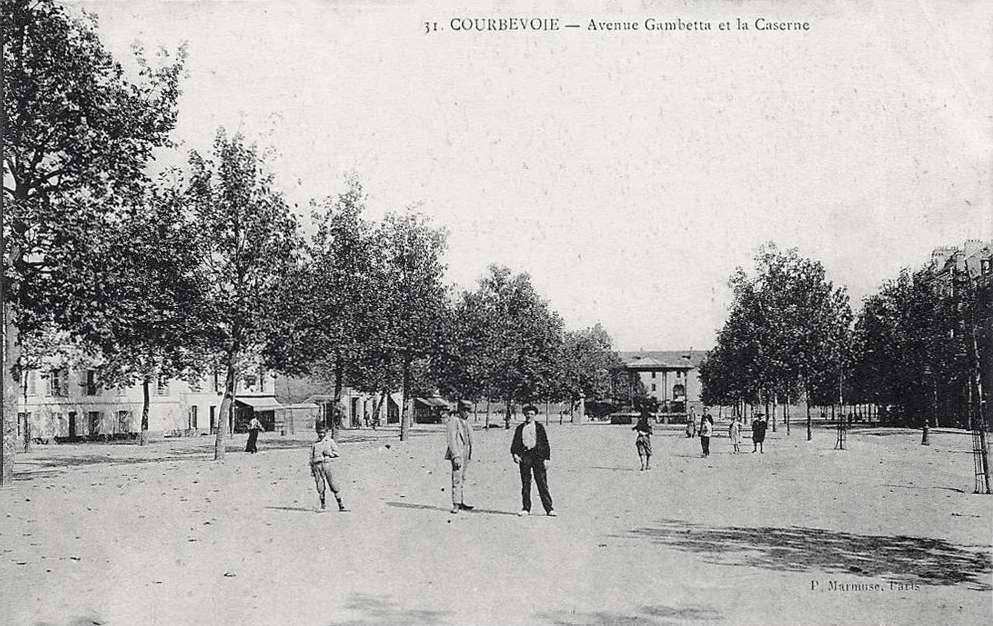
Courveboie, ca. 1900, Avenue Gambetta et la Caserne. Portrait of Jacques Nayral was painted here where Gleizes and his family lived from 1887.

Nayral himself celebrated this collaborative process in his preface to the Cubist exhibition held at the Galerie Dalmau in Barcelona, April - May 1912 (the second Cubist manifestation held outside of Paris): 'You see a portrait in a landscape' wrote Nayral, 'is it simply the reproduction of some lines that permit our eye to recognize a head, clothes, trees? Photography would be sufficient'. Nayral answers the query: 'a thinking human in harmony with the surroundings, in accordance with them', one must 'reveal the concert of all these forms of life that are the thought of this man, the perfume of this flower, the brilliance of this plant, the vibration of this light, this is the task of the artist'. In essence, write Antliff and Leighten in Cubism and Culture, "this synthetic vision was the product of Gleizes's sympathetic response to the expressive acts and physiognomic traits he deemed indicative of the poet's character. Both form and content in the work were the result of Gleizes's mental associations while working from memory.

Just before the 1911 Salon d'Automne—Metzinger had already placed the last brushstroke of paint of Tea Time—Gleizes published a major article about Metzinger, within which he argued that 'representation' was fundamental, but that Metzinger's intention was 'to inscribe the total image'. This total image 'combined the evidence of perception with 'a new truth, born from what his intelligence permits him to know'. Such 'intelligent' knowledge, writes the art historian Christopher Green, "was the accumulation of an all-round study of things, and so it was conveyed by the combination of multiple viewpoints in a single image." He continues, "This accumulation of fragmented aspects would be given 'equilibrium' by a geometric, a 'cubic' structure. Metzinger's Tea-time, a work that attracted much attention at the Salon d'Automne of 1911, is like a pictorial demonstration of Gleizes's text. Multiple perspectives and a firm overall geometric structure (almost a grid) take control of a near pornographic subject: 'intelligence' subdues the senses."

Reviewing the Cubist room at the Salon d'Automne of 1911 in L'Intransigeant, Apollinaire wrote of Gleizes' Portrait of Jacques Nayral:

‘It is a very good likeness, yet in this impressive canvas, there is not one form or color that was not invented by the artist. This portrait has a grandiose appearance that should not escape the notice of connoisseurs.’

Nayral was killed in action in December 1914, at the age of thirty-five, in an attack on a German trench near Arras.

Gleizes first learned of the death of his brother-in-law and friend when a postcard on which he had written "Patience, a little more patience, it is impossible that this war can endure much longer... then we will put ourselves back to work..." came back marked "disparu". Gleizes painted two works entitled To Jacques Nayral (A Jacques Nayral) in 1914 and 1917 as an homage to the writer. These are private portraits that signify an intensely personal memorial to his closest friend and key figure who shared the hopes of the pre-war Passy group for an innovative collective artistic program.

== Criticism ==
The Cubists had become by 1911 a legitimate target for critical disdain and satirical wit. "The cubists play a role in art today analogous to that sustained so effectively in the political and social arena by the apostles of anti-militarism and organized sabotage" wrote the critic Gabriel Mourney in his review of the Salon d'Automne of 1911 for Le Journal, "so doubtless the excesses of the anarchists and saboteurs of French painting will contribute to reviving, in artists and amateurs worthy of the name, the taste for true art and true beauty."

Claude of Le Petit Parisien accused the salon cubists of arrivisme, Janneau for Gil Blas questioned the sincerity of the cubists, and Tardieu in Echo de Paris condemned 'the snobbery of the gullible which applauds the most stupid nonsenses of the arts of painting presented to idiots as the audacities of genius."

Henri Guilbeaux, reviewing the 1911 Indépendants for Les Hommes du jour described the paintings of Metzinger, Léger and others as 'grotesque, ridiculous, intended to bewilder – it would appear – the bourgeoisie', paintings 'whose cubes, cones and pyramids pile up, collapse and...make you laugh.'

Vauxcelles, perhaps more so than his fellow critics, indulged in witty mockery of the salon Cubists: 'But in truth, what honor we do to these bipeds of the parallelepiped, to their lucubrations, cubes, succubi and incubi'. Vauxcelles was more than just skeptical. His comfort level had already been surpassed with the 1907 works of Matisse and Derain, which he perceived as perilous, 'an uncertain schematization, proscribing relief and volumes in the name of I know not what principle of pictorial abstraction.'

His concerns deepened in 1909 as the work of Le Fauconier, Delaunay, Gleizes and Metzinger emerged as a unifying force. He condemned 'the frigid extravagances of a number of mystificators' and queried: 'Do they take us for dupes? Indeed are they fooled themselves? It;s a puzzle hardly worth solving. Let M. Metzinger dance along behind Picasso, or Derain, or Bracke [sic]...let M. Herbin crudely defile a clean canvas – that's their mistakes. We'll not join them...'

== Salon d'Automne of 1911 ==
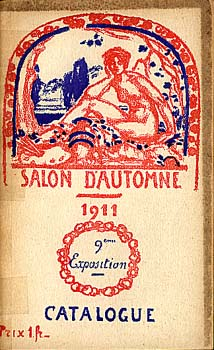
Catalogue cover for the 1911 Salon d'Automne, Paris

In Room 7 and 8 of the 1911 Salon d'Automne, held 1 October through November 8, at the Grand Palais in Paris, hung works by Gleizes, Portrait de Jacques Nayral and La Chasse. Metzinger exhibited Le goûter (Tea Time). Also present were Henri Le Fauconnier, Fernand Léger, Roger de La Fresnaye, André Lhote, Jacques Villon, Marcel Duchamp, František Kupka, Francis Picabia and the Cubist sculptors Alexander Archipenko, Joseph Csaky. The result was a public scandal which brought Cubism to the attention of the general public for the second time. The first was the organized group showing by Cubists in Salle 41 of the 1911 Salon des Indépendants (Paris), with Metzinger, Delaunay, le Fauconnier and Léger.

The author of Portrait of Jacques Nayral later wrote of the exhibition that followed the infamous 1911 Salon des Indépendants:

With the Salon d'Automne of that same year, 1911, the fury broke out again, just as violent as it had been at the Indépendants. I remember this Room 8 in the Grand Palais on the opening day. People were crushed together, shouting, laughing, calling for our heads. And what had we hung? Metzinger his lovely canvas entitled Le Goûter; Léger his sombre Nus dans un Paysage; Le Fauconnier, landscapes done in the Savoie; myself La Chasse and the Portrait de Jacques Nayral. How distant it all seems now! But I can still see the crowd gathering together in the doors of the room, pushing at those who were already pressed into it, wanting to get in to see for themselves the monsters that we were.

The winter season in Paris profited from all this to add a little spice to its pleasures. While the newspapers sounded the alarm to alert people to the danger, and while appeals were made to the public authorities to do something about it, song-writers, satirists and other men of wit and spirit, provoked great pleasure among the leisured classes by playing with the word 'cube', discovering that it was a very suitable means of inducing laughter which, as we all know, is the principle characteristic that distinguishes man from the animals.(Albert Gleizes, 1925)

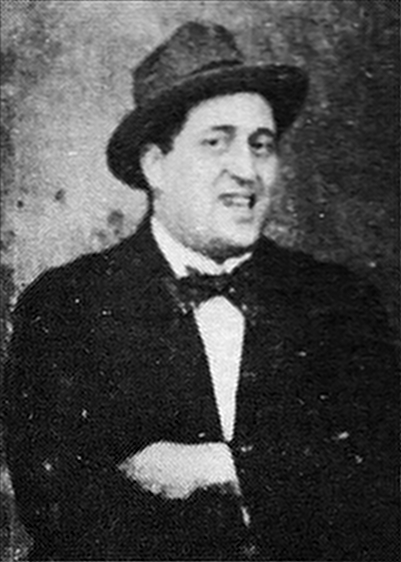
Guillaume Apollinaire in 1914

In his review of the 1911 Salon d'Automne published in L'Intransigeant, written more as a counter attack in defense of Cubism, Guillaume Apollinaire expressed his views on the entries of Metzinger and Gleizes:

The imagination of Metzinger gave us this year two elegant canvases of tones and drawing that attest, at the very least, to a great culture... His art belongs to him now. He has vacated influences and his palette is of a refined richness. Gleizes shows us the two sides of his great talent: invention and observation. Take the example of Portrait de Jacques Nayral, there is good resemblance, but there is not one form or color in this impressive painting that has not been invented by the artist. The portrait has a grandiose appearance that should not escape the notice of connoisseurs. This portrait covers [revêt] a grandiose appearance that should not elude connoisseurs... It is time that young painters turn towards the sublime in their art. La Chasse, by Gleizes, is well composed and of beautiful colors and sings [chantant].

Roger Allard remarked that the general public viewing the works Metzinger, Gleizes and Le Fauconnier at the Salon d'Automne of 1910 found the "deformation of lines" less humorous than the "deformation of color", except with regards to the human face. Christopher Green writes that the "deformations of lines" allowed by mobile perspective in the head of Metzinger's Tea-time and Gleizes's Jacques Nayral "have seemed tentative to historians of Cubism. In 1911, as the key area of likeness and unlikeness, they more than anything released the laughter." Green continues, "This was the wider context of Gris's decision at the Indépendants of 1912 to make his debut with a Homage to Pablo Picasso, which was a portrait, and to do so with a portrait that responded to Picasso's portraits of 1910 through the intermediary of Metzinger's Tea-time.

Apollinaire took Picasso to the opening of the exhibition in 1911 to see the cubist works in Room 7 and 8. At about the time of this exhibition, Gleizes, through the intermediary of Apollinaire, meets Picasso and sees the work of Picasso and Braque for the first time. He gives his reaction in an essay published in another shortlived Abbaye dominated literary magazine, La Revue Indépendante. He considers that Picasso and Braque, despite the great value of their work, are engaged in an 'Impressionism of Form', which is to say that they give an appearance of formal construction which does not rest on any clearly comprehensible principle.

Through the Salon d'Automne, Gleizes also enters into relations with the Duchamp brothers, Jacques Villon (1875-1963), Raymond Duchamp-Villon (1876-1918) and Marcel Duchamp (1887 1968). The studios of Jacques Villon and Raymond Duchamp-Villon at 7, rue Lemaître, become, together with Gleizes' studio at Courbevoie, a regular meeting place for the Cubist group, soon to become known as the Puteaux Group, or Section d'Or.

Reviewing the Salon d'Automne of 1911, Huntly Carter in The New Age writes that "art is not an accessory to life; it is life itself carried to the greatest heights of personal expression." Carter continues:

It was at the Salon d'Automne, amid the Rhythmists, I found the desired sensation. The exuberant eagerness and vitality of their region, consisting of two room remotely situated, was a complete contrast to the morgue I was compelled to pass through in order to reach it. Though marked by extremes, it was clearly the starting point of a new movement in painting, perhaps the most remarkable in modern times, It revealed not only that artists are beginning to recognise the unity of art and life, but that some of them have discovered life is based on rhythmic vitality, and underlying all things is the perfect rhythm that continues and unites them. Consciously, or unconsciously, many are seeking for the perfect rhythm, and in so doing are attaining a liberty or wideness of expression unattained through several centuries of painting. (Huntly Carter, 1911)

== See also ==
- List of works by Albert Gleizes

== Provenance ==
- Joseph Houot (Jacques Nayral)
- Mme Joseph Houot
- Commandant Georges Houot, La Flèche
- Sold by Mme Georges Houot at Sotheby's, London, 5 December 1979, lot 92 reproduced in color
- Tate Modern, purchased at Sotheby's (Grant-in-Aid) 1979

== Exhibitions ==
- Salon d'Automne, Paris, October–November 1911 (609)
- Salon de ‘La Section d'Or’, Galerie La Boëtie, Paris, October 1912 (38)
- Les Maîtres de l'Art Indépendant 1895–1937, Petit Palais, Paris, June–October 1937 (Room 28, 17)
- Le Cubisme (1907–1914), Musée National d'Art Moderne, Paris, January–April 1953 (64)
- II Bienal, São Paulo, December 1953–February 1954 (Cubist room 16)
- Albert Gleizes 1881–1953, Guggenheim Museum, New York, September–November 1964 (11, repr.)
- Musée National d'Art Moderne, Paris, December 1964–January 1965 (11, repr.)
- Museum am Ostwall, Dortmund, March–April 1965 (11, repr.) Tate Modern
- Cubisti Cubismo, Complesso del Vittoriano, Rome, 8 March–23 June 2013
- Le cubisme, 17 October 2018 – 25 February 2019, Galerie 1, Centre Pompidou, Musée National d'Art Moderne, Paris. Kunstmuseum Basel, 31 March – 5 August 2019

== Literature ==
- Guillaume Apollinaire in L'Intransigeant, 10 October 1911
- Fantasio, 15 October 1911, Albert Gleizes, Portrait of Jacques Nayral, Jean Metzinger, Le Gouter, Tea Time, 1911
- Jacques Nayral [pseudo. of Jacques Huot], Préface, Exposició d'art cubista, Galeries J. Dalmau, Barcelona, 20 April - 10 May 1912, p. 1-7, illustrated in the preface
- Albert Gleizes and Jean Metzinger, Du "Cubisme", published by Eugène Figuière, Paris, 1912, translated to English and Russian in 1913
- Guillaume Apollinaire, Le Petit Bleu, March 20, 1912 (cf. Chroniques d'Art, 1960, p. 230).
- Guillaume Apollinaire, Méditations esthétiques. Les peintres cubistes (The Cubist Painters) Edition Figuière, Paris, 1913
- Albert Gleizes, ‘L'Epopée’ in Le Rouge et le Noir, October 1929, p. 64, repr.
- Bonfante, E. and Ravenna, J. Arte Cubista con "les Méditations esthétiques sur la Peinture" di Guillaume Apollinaire, Venice, 1945, no. LVIII.
- Musee d'Art Moderne de la Ville de Paris, Catalogue-Guide, Paris, 1961.
- Robbins, Daniel, Albert Gleizes 1881 – 1953, A Retrospective Exhibition, Published by The Solomon R. Guggenheim Foundation, New York, in collaboration with Musée National d'Art Moderne, Paris, Museum am Ostwall, Dortmund, 1964 (catalogue no. 31).
- Joan A. Speers (ed.), Art at Auction: The Year at Sotheby Parke Bernet 1979–80, 1980, p. 114 in color; Tate Gallery 1978–80, p. 50 in color
- The Tate Gallery 1978-80: Illustrated Catalogue of Acquisitions, London 1981
- Varichon, Anne, Albert Gleizes – Catalogue Raisonné, Volume 1, Paris, Somogy éditions d'art/Fondation Albert Gleizes, 1998, ISBN 2-85056-286-6.
- Mark Antliff, Patricia Dee Leighten, Cubism and Culture, Thames & Hudson, 2001
