= Du "Cubisme" =

1912 book by Albert Gleizes and Jean Metzinger

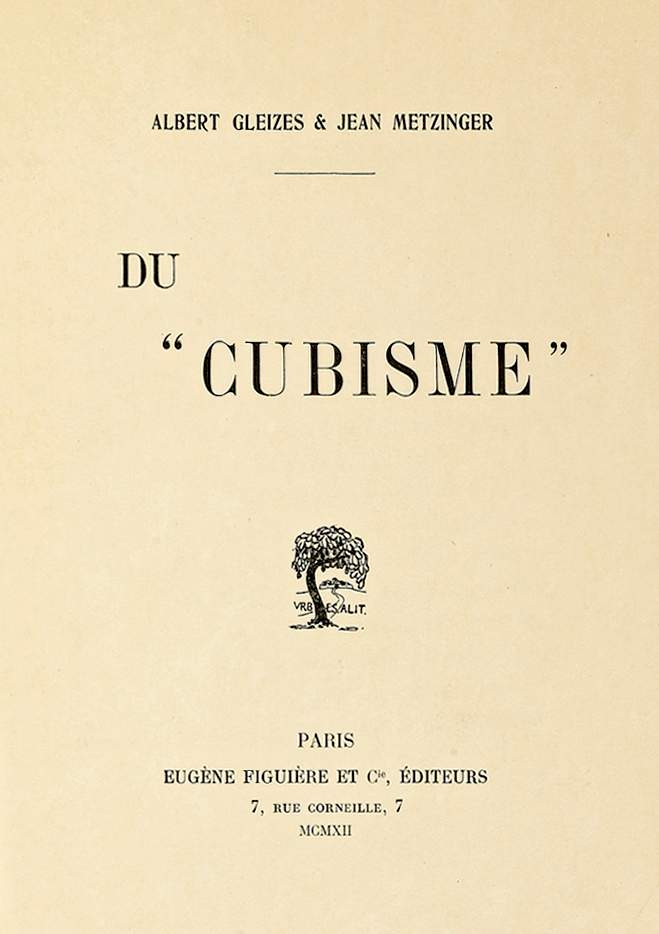
Du "Cubisme", 1912, Albert Gleizes and Jean Metzinger, published by Eugène Figuière Éditeurs (cover)

Du "Cubisme", also written Du Cubisme, or Du « Cubisme » (and in English, On Cubism or Cubism), is a book written in 1912 by Albert Gleizes and Jean Metzinger. This was the first major text on Cubism, predating Les Peintres Cubistes by Guillaume Apollinaire (1913). The book is illustrated with black and white photographs of works by Paul Cézanne (1), Gleizes (5), Metzinger (5), Fernand Léger (5), Juan Gris (1), Francis Picabia (2), Marcel Duchamp (2), Pablo Picasso (1), Georges Braque (1), André Derain (1), and Marie Laurencin (2).

The highly influential treatise was published by Eugène Figuière Éditeurs, Collection "Tous les Arts", in Paris in 1912. Prior to publication the book was announced in the Revue d'Europe et d'Amérique, March 1912; for the occasion of the Salon de Indépendants during the spring of 1912 in the Gazette des beaux-arts; and in Paris-Journal, October 26, 1912. It is thought to have appeared in November or early December 1912. It was subsequently published in English and Russian in 1913; a translation and analysis in the latter language by the artist, theorist and musician Mikhail Matiushin appeared in the March 1913 issue of Union of the Youth, where the text was quite influential.

A new edition was published in 1947 with an avant-propos by Gleizes and an epilogue by Metzinger. The artists took the occasion to reflect upon the evolution of this avant-garde artistic movement thirty-three years after the appearance of the first publication of Du "Cubism".

== Background ==
The collaboration between Albert Gleizes and Jean Metzinger that would lead to the publication of Du "Cubisme" began during the aftermath of the 1910 Salon d'Automne. At this massive Parisian exhibition, renowned for displaying the latest and most radical artistic tendencies, several artists including Gleizes, and in particular Metzinger, stood out from the rest. The utilization of a non-conventional form of geometry had permeated the works of these artists who a priori had little or no contact between one another.

Jean Metzinger, 1910, Nu à la cheminée (Nude). Exhibited at the 1910 Salon d'Automne. Published in Les Peintres Cubistes by Guillaume Apollinaire in 1913. Reproduced in Du "Cubisme"

(1) Jean Metzinger, 1911, Le goûter (Tea Time), Philadelphia Museum of Art. Exhibited at the 1911 Salon d'Automne. Published in Fantasio, Oct. 15, 1911, and Les Peintres Cubistes by Guillaume Apollinaire, 1913. André Salmon dubbed this painting "The Mona Lisa of Cubism". Reproduced in Du "Cubisme" (2) Juan Gris, 1912, Hommage à Pablo Picasso, Art Institute of Chicago. Exhibited at the 1912 Salon des Indépendants

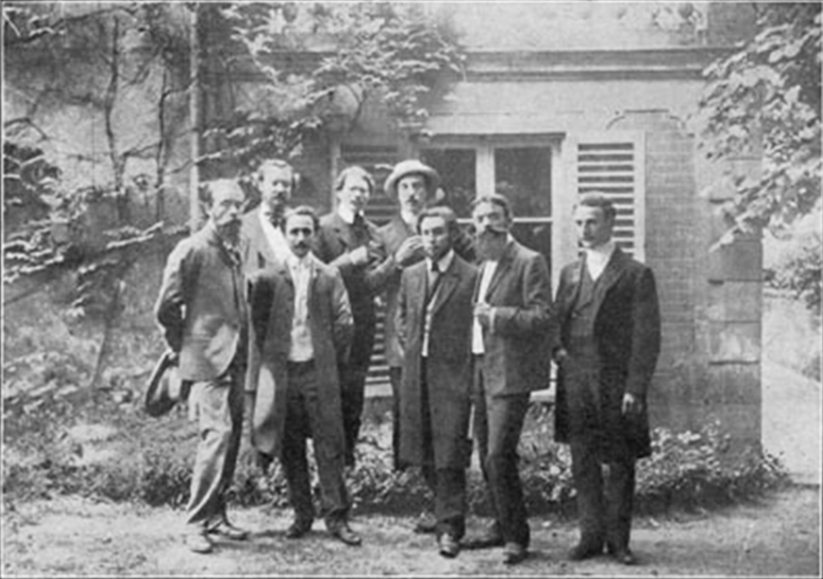
Abbaye de Créteil, ca.1908. First row: Charles Vildrac, René Arcos, Albert Gleizes, Barzun, Alexandre Mercereau. Second row: Georges Duhamel, Berthold Mahn, d'Otémar

Jean Metzinger, 1911–12, Le Port (The Harbor), dimensions and current location unknown. Exhibited at the 1912 Salon des Indépendants, Paris. Reproduced in Les Peintres Cubistes Guillaume Apollinaire, 1913. Reproduced in Du "Cubisme"

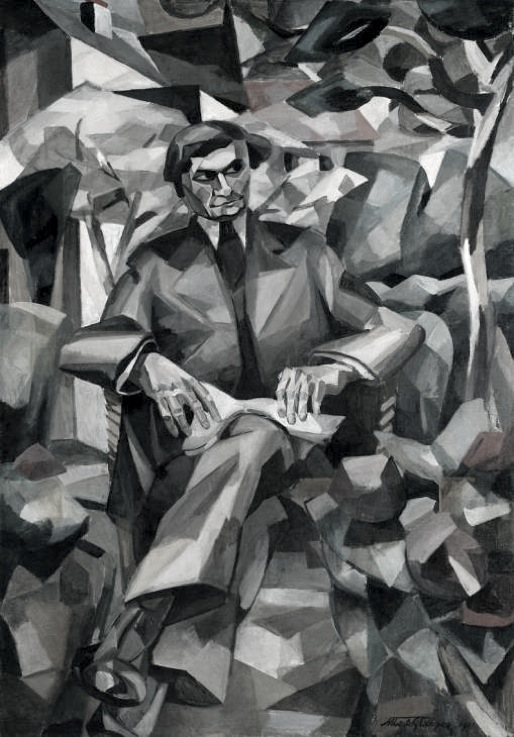
Albert Gleizes, 1911, Portrait de Jacques Nayral, oil on canvas, 161.9 x 114 cm, Tate Modern, London. This painting was reproduced in Fantasio: published October 15, 1911, for the occasion of the Salon d'Automne where it was exhibited the same year. Study for Portrait of Jacques Nayral reproduced in Du "Cubisme"

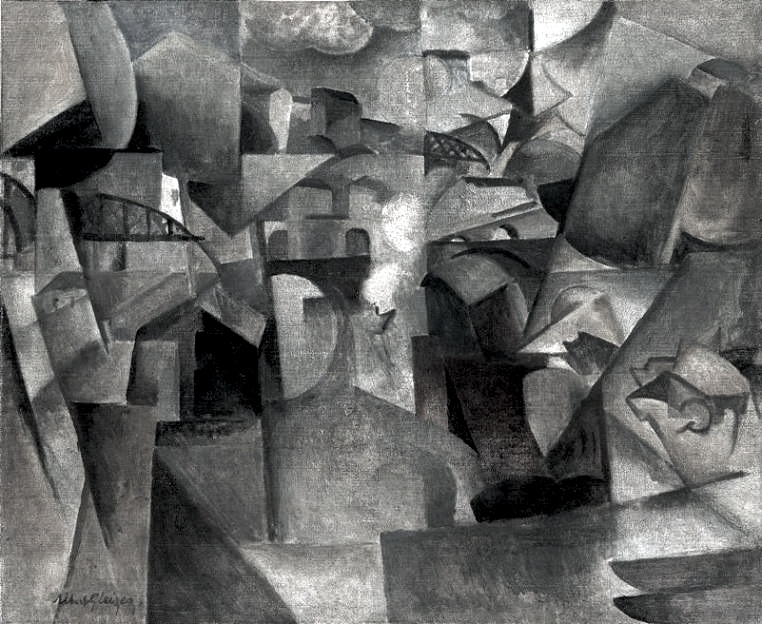
Albert Gleizes, 1912, Les ponts de Paris (Passy), The Bridges of Paris (Passy), oil on canvas, 60.5 x 73.2 cm, Museum Moderner Kunst (mumok), Vienna. Published in Du "Cubisme", 1912

Albert Gleizes, 1912, Les Baigneuses, oil on canvas, 105 x 171 cm, Musée d'Art Moderne de la Ville de Paris. Published in Du "Cubisme"

Jean Metzinger, 1911–1912, La Femme au Cheval, Woman with a horse, oil on canvas, 162 x 130 cm, Statens Museum for Kunst, National Gallery of Denmark. Published in Du "Cubisme", 1912, and Apollinaire's 1913 Les Peintres Cubistes, Exhibited at the 1912 Salon des Indépendants. Provenance: Jacques Nayral, Niels Bohr. Reproduced in Du "Cubisme"

Marcel Duchamp, 1911, La sonate (Sonata), oil on canvas, 145.1 x 113.3 cm, Philadelphia Museum of Art, (Black and white). Reproduced in Du "Cubisme"

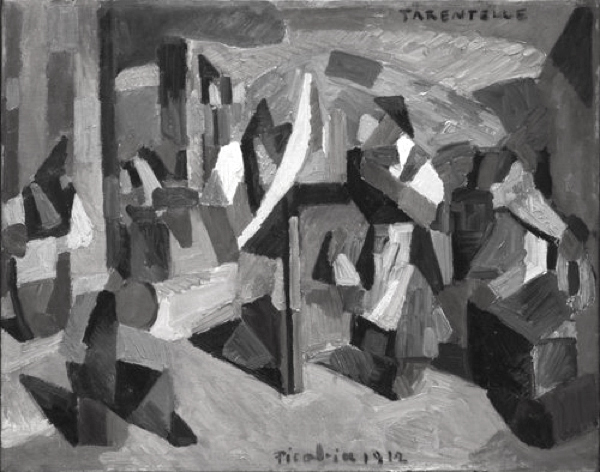
Francis Picabia, 1912, Tarentelle, oil on canvas, 73.6 x 92.1 cm, Museum of Modern Art, New York (Black and white). Published in Du "Cubisme"

Fernand Léger, 1910–11, Le compotier (Table and Fruit), oil on canvas, 82.2 x 97.8 cm, Minneapolis Institute of Arts

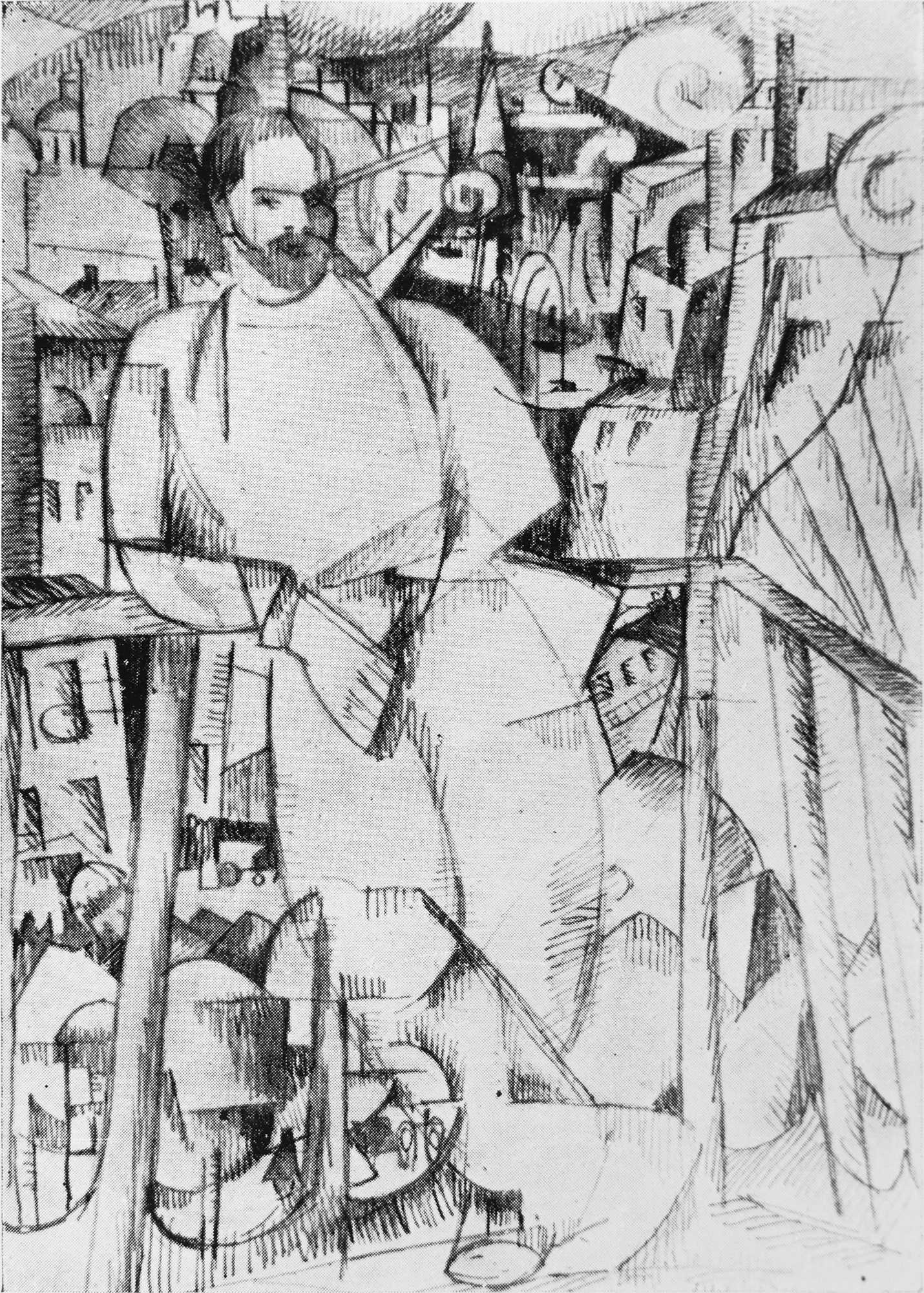
Albert Gleizes, 1912, Dessin pour L'Homme au balcon, exhibited Salon des Indépendants 1912

In a review of the 1910 Salon d'Automne the poet Roger Allard (1885-1961) announced the appearance of a new school of French painters who—in contrast with Les Fauves and Neo-Impressionists—concentrated their attention on form rather than on color. A group formed following the exhibition that would include Gleizes, Metzinger, Henri Le Fauconnier, Fernand Léger, and Robert Delaunay (a friend and associate of Metzinger since 1906). They convened regularly at the studio of le Fauconnier where he worked on his ambitious allegorical painting entitled L'Abondance. "In this painting" writes Brooke, "the simplification of the representational form gives way to a new complexity in which foreground and background are united and the subject of the painting obscured by a network of interlocking geometrical elements". But it was Metzinger, a Montmartrois in close contact with Le Bateau-Lavoir and its habitués—including Guillaume Apollinaire, Max Jacob, Maurice Princet, Pablo Picasso and Georges Braque—who introduced to Gleizes and the others of the group, with his Nu à la cheminée (Nu), 1910, an extreme species of 'analytic' Cubism (a term that would emerge years later to describe the 1910–1911 works of Picasso and Braque).

A few months later, during the spring of 1911 at the Salon des Indépendants, the term "Cubisme" (derived by critics' attempts to derogatorily ridicule the "geometrical follies" that gave a "cubic" appearance to their work) would officially be introduced to the public in relation to these artists exhibiting in the 'Salle 41', which included Gleizes, Metzinger, Le Fauconnier, Léger, and Delaunay (but not Picasso or Braque, both absent from public exhibitions at the time resulting from a contract with the Kahnweiler gallery).

A seminal text written by Metzinger titled Note sur la peinture, published during the fall of 1910, closely coinciding with Salon d'Automne, cites Picasso, Braque, Delaunay and Le Fauconnier as painters who were realising a 'total emancipation' ['affranchissement fondementale'] of painting.

The idea of moving around an object in order to see it from different view-points later treated in Du "Cubisme" was a central idea of Metzinger's Note sur la Peinture. Indeed, prior to Cubism painters worked from the limiting factor of a single view-point. Metzinger enunciated for the first time in Note sur la peinture the stimulating interest in representing objects as remembered from successive and subjective experiences within the context of both space and time. In that article, Metzinger notes that Braque and Picasso "discarded traditional perspective and granted themselves the liberty of moving around objects." This is the concept of "mobile perspective" that would tend towards the representation of the "total image"; a series of ideas that still today define the fundamental characteristics of Cubist art.

Setting the stage for Du "Cubisme", Metzinger's Note sur la peinture not only highlighted the works of Picasso and Braque, on the one hand, Le Fauconnier and Delaunay on the other. It was also a tactical selection that highlighted the fact that only Metzinger himself was positioned to write about all four. Metzinger, uniquely, had been closely acquainted with the Montmartre group (gallery cubists) and the burgeoning Salon Cubists simultaneously.

== Section d'Or ==
The Salon de la Section d'Or was an exhibition organized by the Salon Cubists with the goal of bringing together all the most radical trends in painting and sculpture to date. Scheduled to take place at the Galerie La Boétie in Paris, October 1912, directly after the Salon d'Automne. Gleizes and Metzinger, in preparation for the Salon de la Section d'Or, published Du "Cubisme", a major defense of Cubism, resulting in the first theoretical essay on the new movement; predating Les Peintres Cubistes, Méditations Esthétiques (The Cubist Painters, Aesthetic Meditations) by Guillaume Apollinaire (1913) and Der Weg zum Kubismus by Daniel-Henry Kahnweiler (1920).

Before World War I the image of Cubism in France and abroad was founded on an extremely broad definition. "A more heterogeneous view of Cubism is certainly encouraged by the earliest promotional writings by its practitioners and associates", writes art historian Christopher Green:

Picasso, Braque and Gris made almost no published statements on the subject before 1914. The first major text, Du cubisme, was produced by two 'Salle 41' Cubists, Gleizes and Metzinger, in 1912; this was followed in 1913 by a far from systematic collection of reflections and commentaries by the poet and critic Guillaume Apollinaire, who had been closely involved with Picasso (from 1905) and Braque (from 1907), but who gave as much attention to artists such as Delaunay, Picabia and Duchamp. Along with Léger he identified these three with a new tendency, which he labelled Orphic Cubism or Orphism and which he considered of special significance for the future. Painters such as Gleizes, Metzinger, Delaunay and Duchamp were powerful influences alongside Picasso, Braque, Gris and Léger in the development of art related to Cubism in Russia, Czechoslovakia, Italy, the Netherlands, Britain, Spain and the USA.

The Salon d’Automne of 1912 led to a debate on Cubism in the Chambre des Députés: since the exhibition was held in the State's Grand Palais, the State was seen as subsidizing Cubism. It was against this background of public anger and revolt that Gleizes and Metzinger wrote Du "Cubisme". It was not solely an initiative to explain the new art, but an attempt to persuade the masses that their intentions were genuine.

The 'Salle 41' Cubists, through Gleizes, were closely associated with the Abbaye de Créteil; a group of writers and artists that included Alexandre Mercereau, Jules Romains, Georges Chennevière, Henri-Martin Barzun, Pierre Jean Jouve, Georges Duhamel, Luc Durtain, Charles Vildrac and René Arcos. Many were interested in notion of 'duration' proposed by the philosopher Henri Bergson, according to which life is experienced subjectively as a continual movement in the direction of time, with the past flowing into the present and the present merging into the future. Other Cubists showed affinities with this concept, and to Bergson's insistence on the 'elasticity' of our consciousness in both time and space.

The Neo-Symbolist writers Jacques Nayral and Henri-Martin Barzun associated with the Unanimist movement in poetry. In his capacity as Figuière's editorial assistant Nayral had selected for publishing Du "Cubisme" and Les Peintres Cubistes as part of a projected series on the arts. These writers and other Symbolists valued expression and subjective experience over an objective view of the physical world, embracing an antipositivist or antirationalist perspective.

In Du "Cubisme" Gleizes and Metzinger explicitly related the concept of 'multiple perspective' to the Bergsonian sense of time. The faceted treatment of physical objects and space blurred the distinctions (by means of 'passage') between subject and abstraction, between representation and non-objectivity. Effects of non-Euclidean geometry were used to convey a psychophysical sense of fluidity of consciousness. These preoccupations are in tune with Jules Romains’ theory of Unanimism, which stresses the importance of collective feelings in the breaking down of barriers between people.

One major innovation made by Gleizes and Metzinger was the inclusion of the concept of simultaneity into not just the theoretical framework of Cubism, but into the physical paintings themselves. It was in part a concept born out of a conviction based on their understanding of Henri Poincaré and Bergson that the separation or distinction between space and time should be comprehensively challenged. New philosophical and scientific ideas were emerging based on non-Euclidean geometry, Riemannian geometry and the relativity of knowledge, contradicting notions of absolute truth. These ideas were disseminated and debated in widely available publications, and read by writers and artists associated with the advent of Cubism.

Poincaré postulated that the laws believed to govern matter were created solely by the minds that 'understood' them and that no theory could be considered 'true'. "The things themselves are not what science can reach..., but only the relations between things. Outside of these relations there is no knowable reality", Poincaré wrote in his 1902 Science and Hypothesis.

== Passages from Du "Cubisme" ==
Metzinger and Gleizes wrote with reference to non-Euclidean geometry in Du "Cubisme". It was argued that Cubism itself was not based on any geometrical theory, but that non-Euclidean geometry corresponded better than classical, or Euclidean geometry, to what the Cubists were doing. The essential was in the understanding of space other than by the classical method of perspective; an understanding that would include and integrate the fourth dimension with 3-space.

The reconstruction of the total image was left to the creative intuition of the observer. The spectator now played an active role. Taken at face value, each of the constituent parts (the fragments or facets) are just as important as the whole. Yet, the total image, greater than the sum of the parts of which it is composed, now resides in the mind of the beholder. The dynamism of form implicit or explicit in the quantitative and qualitative properties of the work, set in motion by the artist, could be reassembled and understood in a dynamic process no longer solely restricted to the artist and subject matter.

The concept of observing a subject from different points in space and time simultaneously (multiple or mobile perspective) "to seize it from several successive appearances, which fused into a single image, reconstitute in time" developed by Metzinger (in his 1911 article Cubisme et tradition) and touched upon in Du "Cubisme", was not derived from Albert Einstein's theory of relativity, though it was certainly influenced in a similar way, through the work of Jules Henri Poincaré (particularly Science and Hypothesis). Poincaré's writings, unlike Einstein's, were well known leading up to 1912. Poincaré's widely read book, La Science et l'Hypothèse, was published in 1902 (by Flammarion).

Gleizes and Metzinger render homage to Cézanne in their 1912 Cubist manifesto Du "Cubisme":

To understand Cézanne is to foresee Cubism. Henceforth we are justified in saying that between this school and previous manifestations there is only a difference of intensity, and that in order to assure ourselves of this we have only to study the methods of this realism, which, departing from the superficial reality of Courbet, plunges with Cézanne into profound reality, growing luminous as it forces the unknowable to retreat.

For Metzinger and Gleizes, Cubism was nothing less than an extension of a tradition in painting:

Some maintain that such a tendency distorts the curve of tradition. Do they derive their arguments from the future or the past? The future does not belong to them, as far as we are aware, and it requires extraordinary naivete to want to measure what is by the standard of what no longer exists.

Unless we are to condemn all modern painting, we must regard cubism as legitimate, for it continues modern methods, and we should see in it the only conception of pictorial art now possible. In other words, at this moment cubism is painting."

The artist endeavours to enclose the unmeasurable sum of the affinities perceived between the visible manifestation and the tendency of his mind, write Metzinger and Gleizes:

Let the picture imitate nothing; let it nakedly present its raison d'être. We should indeed be ungrateful were we to deplore the absence of all those things flowers, or landscape, or faces whose mere reflection it might have been. Nevertheless, let us admit that the reminiscence of natural forms cannot be absolutely banished; not yet, at all events. An art cannot be raised to the level of a pure effusion at the first step.

This is understood by the cubist painters, who indefatigably study pictorial form and the space which it engenders.

This space we have negligently confounded with pure visual space or with Euclidian space. Euclid, in one of his postulates, speaks of the indeformability of figures in movement, so we need not insist upon this point.

If we wished to relate the space of the [Cubist] painters to geometry, we should have to refer it to the non-Euclidean mathematicians; we should have to study, at some length, certain of Riemann's theorems.

As for visual space, we know that it results from the agreement of the sensations of convergence and "accommodation" in the eye.

The convergence of classical perspective to evoke depth is treated in Du "Cubisme" as an illusion. "Moreover, we know that even the most serious infractions of the rules of perspective by no means detract from the spatiality of a painting. The Chinese painters evoke space, although they exhibit a strong partiality for divergence."

To establish pictorial space, we must have recourse to tactile and motor sensations, indeed to all our faculties. It is our whole personality, contracting or dilating, that transforms the plane of the picture. Since in reaction this plane reflects the viewer's personality back upon his understanding, pictorial space may be defined as a sensible passage between two subjective spaces.

The forms which are situated within this space spring from a dynamism which we profess to command. In order that our intelligence may possess it, let us first exercise our sensibility. There are only nuances; form appears endowed with properties identical with those of colour. It can be tempered or augmented by contact with another form; it can be destroyed or emphasized; it is multiplied or it disappears. An ellipse may change its circumference because it is inscribed in a polygon. A form which is more emphatic than the surrounding forms may govern the whole picture, may imprint its own effigy upon everything. Those picture-makers who minutely imitate one or two leaves in order that all the leaves of a tree may seem to be painted, show in a clumsy fashion that they suspect this truth. An illusion, perhaps, but we must take it into account. The eye quickly interests the mind in its errors. These analogies and contrasts are capable of all good and all evil; the masters felt this when they tried to compose with pyramids, crosses, circles, semicircles, etc.

The Cubists, according to the 1912 manifesto written by Gleizes and Mtezinger, revealed a new manner of regarding light:

According to them, to illuminate is to reveal; to colour is to specify the mode of revelation. They call luminous that which strikes the imagination, and dark that which the imagination has to penetrate.

We do not mechanically connect the sensation of white with the idea of light, any more than we connect the sensation of black with the idea of darkness. We know that a precious stone in black, and in a mat black, can be more luminous than the white satin or the pink of its jewel case. Loving light, we refuse to measure it, and we avoid the geometrical ideas of the focus and the ray, which imply the repetition-contrary to the principle of variety which guides us-of bright planes and sombre intervals in a given direction. Loving colour, we refuse to limit it, and subdued or dazzling, fresh or muddy, we accept all the possibilities contained between the two extreme points of the spectrum, between the cold and the warm tone.

Here are a thousand tints which issue from the prism, and hasten to range themselves in the lucid region forbidden to those who are blinded by the immediate...

There are two methods of regarding the division of the canvas, in addition to the inequality of parts being granted as a prime condition. Both methods are based on the relationship between color and form:

According to the first, all the parts are connected by a rhythmic convention which is determined by one of them. This—its position on the canvas matters little—gives the painting a centre from which the gradations of colour proceed, or towards which they tend, according as the maximum or minimum of intensity resides there.

According to the second method, in order that the spectator, himself free to establish unity, may apprehend all the elements in the order assigned to them by creative intuition, the properties of each portion must be left independent, and the plastic continuum must be broken into a thousand surprises of light and shade. [...]

Every inflection of form is accompanied by a modification of colour, and every modification of colour gives birth to a form.

Gleizes and Metzinger continue:

There is nothing real outside ourselves; there is nothing real except the coincidence of a sensation and an individual mental direction. Far be it from us to throw any doubts upon the existence of the objects which strike our senses; but, rationally speaking, we can only have certitude with regard to the images which they produce in the mind.

It therefore amazes us when well-meaning critics try to explain the remarkable difference between the forms attributed to nature and those of modern painting by a desire to represent things not as they appear, but as they are. As they are! How are they, what are they? According to them, the object possesses an absolute form, an essential form, and we should suppress chiaroscuro and traditional perspective in order to present it. What simplicity! An object has not one absolute form; it has many. It has as many as there are planes in the region of perception. What these writers say is marvelously applicable to geometrical form. Geometry is a science; painting is an art. The geometer measures; the painter savours. The absolute of the one is necessarily the relative of the other; if logic takes fright at this idea, so much the worse! Will logic ever prevent a wine from being different in the retort of the chemist and in the glass of the drinker?

We are frankly amused to think that many a novice may perhaps pay for his too literal comprehension of the remarks of one cubist, and his faith in the existence of an Absolute Truth, by painfully juxtaposing the six faces of a cube or the two ears of a model seen in profile.

Does it ensue from this that we should follow the example of the impressionists and rely upon the senses alone? By no means. We seek the essential, but we seek it in our personality and not in a sort of eternity, laboriously divided by mathematicians and philosophers.

Moreover, as we have said, the only difference between the impressionists and ourselves is a difference of intensity, and we do not wish it to be otherwise.

There are as many images of an object as there are eyes which look at it; there are as many essential images of it as there are minds which comprehend it.

But we cannot enjoy in isolation; we wish to dazzle others with that which we daily snatch from the world of sense, and in return we wish others to show us their trophies. From a reciprocity of concessions arise those mixed images, which we hasten to confront with artistic creations in order to compute what they contain of the objective; that is of the purely conventional.

== English edition ==
Reviewing the English edition, Cubism, T. Fisher Unwin, 1913, a critic in The Burlington magazine for Connoisseurs writes:

For the authors of this book "painting is not—or is no longer—the art of imitating an object by means of lines and colours, but the art of giving our instinct a plastic consciousness". Many will follow them so far who will be unable or unwilling to follow them further on the road to cubism. Yet even to the unwilling their book will prove suggestive. Their theory of painting is founded upon a philosophic idealism. It is impossible to paint things "as they are", because it is impossible to know how and what they "really" are. Decoration must go by the board; decorative work is the antithesis of the picture, which "bears its pretext, the reason for its existence, within it". The authors are not afraid of the conclusions which they find resulting from their premisses. The ultimate aim of painting is to touch the crowd; but it is no business of the painter to explain himself to the crowd. On the contrary, it is the business of the crowd to follow the painter in his transubstantiation of the object, "so that the most accustomed eye has some difficulty in discovering it". Yet the authors disapprove of "fantastic occultism" no less than of the negative truth conveyed by the conventional symbols of the academic painters. Indeed, the object of the whole book is to condemn systems of all kinds, and to defend cubism as the liberator from systems, the means of expression of the one truth, which is the truth in the artist's mind. The short but able and suggestive essay is followed by twenty-five half-tone illustrations, from Cézanne to Picabia.

== Press article ==
Les Annales politiques et littéraires, Le Cubisme devant les Artistes, 1 December 1912. This is a three-page article in which various critics express their often severe opinions on Cubism, Futurism and the underlying theory presented in Du "Cubisme". On the third page Albert Gleizes responds in defense of the new art. (In French)

== Other works reproduced ==
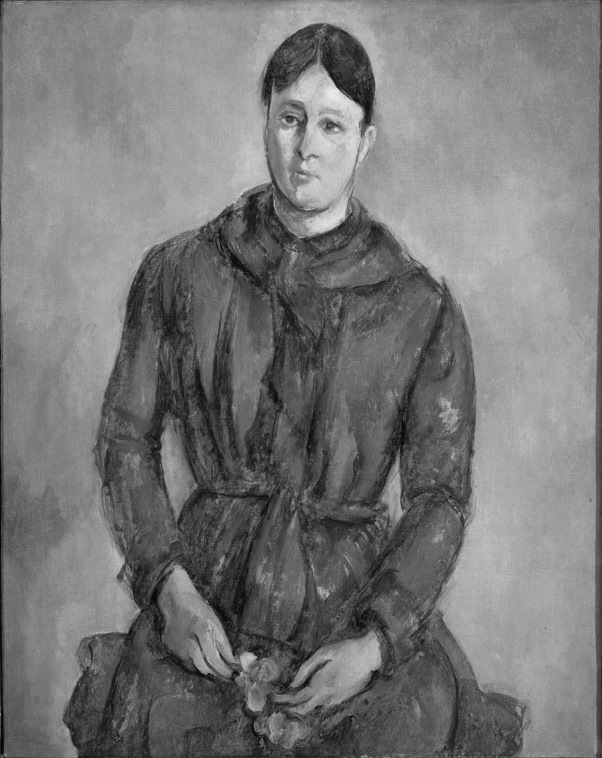
Paul Cézanne, 1890–94, Madame Cézanne in a Red Dress, oil on canvas, 93.3 cm × 74 cm (36.7 in × 29.1 in), São Paulo Museum of Art

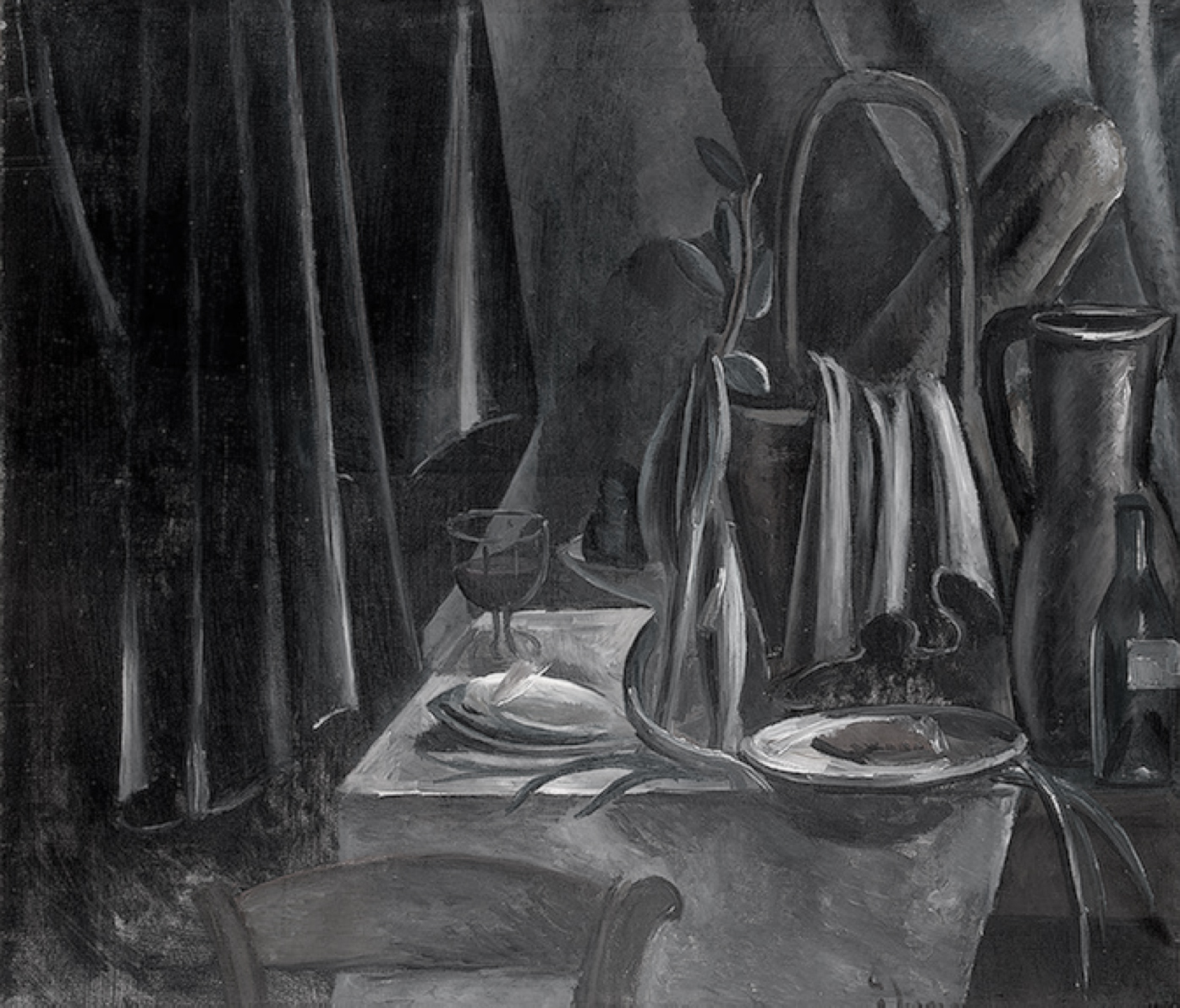
André Derain, 1912, Nature morte (Still Life), oil on canvas, 100.5 cm × 118 cm (39.6 in × 46.5 in), State Hermitage Museum, Saint Petersburg, Russia

Jean Metzinger, c.1912, Paysage (Landscape), oil on canvas, private collection

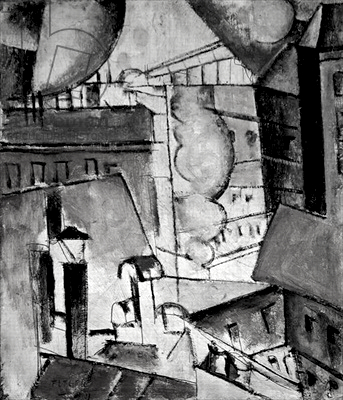
Fernand Léger, 1911, Les toits de Paris (Roofs in Paris), oil on canvas, private collection

Georges Braque, 1911, Nature morte (Still Life)

Pablo Picasso, c.1911, Le Guitariste

Marcel Duchamp, 1911, Coffee Mill (Moulin à café), oil and graphite on board, 33 cm × 12.7 cm (13.0 in × 5.0 in), Tate, London

Marie Laurencin, c.1912, Femme à l'éventail (Woman with a Fan)

Marie Laurencin, 1910–11, Jeunes filles, oil on canvas, 115 cm × 146 cm (45 in × 57 in), Moderna Museet, Stockholm

== See also ==
- List of works by Albert Gleizes
- List of works by Jean Metzinger
