= Tea Time (Metzinger) =

1911 oil painting by Jean Metzinger

- Le Gouter (French)
- Artist: Jean Metzinger
- Year: 1911
- Medium: Oil on cardboard
- Dimensions: 75.9 cm × 70.2 cm (29.8 in × 27.6 in)
- Location: Philadelphia Museum of Art, The Louise and Walter Arensberg Collection, 1950, Philadelphia

Tea Time (French: Le Goûter, also known as Femme à la Cuillère or Woman with a teaspoon) is an oil painting created in 1911 by the French artist and theorist Jean Metzinger. It was exhibited in Paris at the Salon d'Automne of 1911, and the Salon de la Section d'Or, 1912.

The painting was first reproduced (illustrated) in Chroniques Médico-Artistique, Le Sabotage Anatomique au Salon d'Automne (1911). The following year it was reproduced in Du "Cubisme", by Jean Metzinger and Albert Gleizes (1912). In 1913 it was published in The Cubist Painters, Aesthetic Meditations (Les Peintres Cubistes) by Guillaume Apollinaire. The painting was subsequently published in Arthur Jerome Eddy's Cubists and Post-impressionism, 1914, titled The Taster.

Art critic Louis Vauxcelles in a literary newspaper Gil Blas, 30 September 1911, referred to Le goûter sarcastically as "la Joconde à la cuiller" (Mona Lisa with a spoon).

André Salmon dubbed this painting "La Joconde du Cubisme" ("La Joconde Cubiste"), "The Mona Lisa of Cubism" ("Mona Lisa with a teaspoon"). Tea Time "was far more famous than any painting that Picasso and Braque had made up until this time", according to curator Michael Taylor (Philadelphia Museum of Art), "because Picasso and Braque, by not showing at the Salons, have actually removed themselves from the public ... For most people, the idea of Cubism was actually associated with an artist like Metzinger, far more than Picasso." (Taylor, 2010)

Le Goûter forms part of the Louise and Walter Arensberg Collection, Philadelphia Museum of Art.

== Description ==
Tea Time is an oil painting on cardboard with dimensions 75.9 x 70.2 cm (29.9 x 27.6 in), signed Metzinger and dated 1911 lower right. The painting represents a barely draped (nude) woman holding a spoon, seated at a table with a cup of tea. In the 'background', the upper left quadrant, stands a vase on a commode, table or shelf. A square or cubic shape, a chair or painting behind the model, espouses the shape of the stretcher. The painting is practically square, like the side of a cube. The woman's head is highly stylized, divided into geometrized facets, planes and curves (the forehead, nose, cheeks, hair). The source of light appears to be off to her right, with some reflected light on the left side of her face. Reflected light, consistently, can be seen on other parts of her body (breast, shoulder, arm). Her breast is composed of a triangle and a sphere. The faceting of the rest of her body, to some extent, coincides with actual muscular and skeletal features (collar bone, ribcage, pectorals, deltoids, neck tissue). Both of her shoulders are coupled with elements of the background, superimposed, gradational and transparent to varying degrees. Unidentified elements are composed of alternating angular structures, The colors employed by Metzinger are subdued, mixed (either on a palette or directly on the surface), with an overall natural allure. The brushwork is reminiscent of Metzinger's Divisionist period (ca. 1903–1907), described by the critic (Louis Vauxcelles) in 1907 as large, mosaic-like 'cubes', used to construct small but highly symbolic compositions.

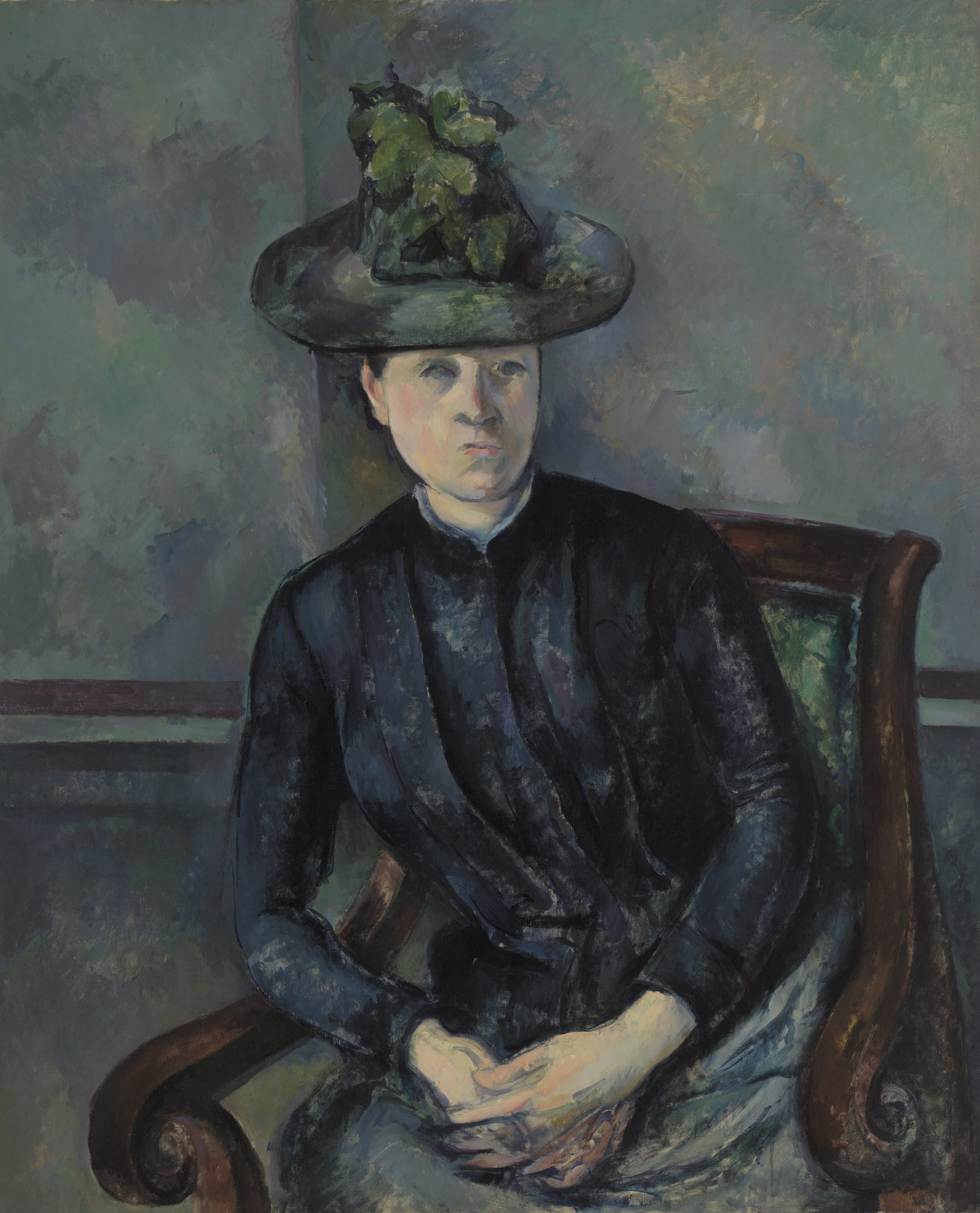
Paul Cézanne, Femme au Chapeau Vert (Woman in a Green Hat. Madame Cézanne), 1894–1895, oil on canvas, 100.3 x 81.3 cm, The Barnes Foundation, Merion, PA

The figure, centrally positioned, is shown both staring at the viewer and gazing off to the right (to her left), i.e., she is seen both straight on and in profile position. The tea cup is visible both from the top and side simultaneously, as if the artist physically moved around the subject to capture it simultaneously from several angles and at successive moments in time.

"This interplay of visual, tactile, and motor spaces is fully operative in Metzinger's Le Gouter of 1911", write Antliff and Leighten, "an image of an artist's model, semi-nude, with a cloth draped over her right arm as she takes a break between sessions [...] her right hand delicately suspends the spoon between cup and mouth." The combination of frames captured at successive time intervals is given play, pictorially, in simultaneous conflation of moments in time throughout the work. The Cézannian volumes and planes (cones, cubes and spheres) extend ubiquitously across the manifold, merging the sitter and surroundings. The painting becomes a product of experience, memory and imagination, evoking a complex series of mind-associations between past present and future, between tactile and olfactory sensations (taste and touch), between the physical and metaphysical.

Though less radical than Metzinger's 1910 Nude—which is closely related to the work of Picasso and Braque of the same year—from the viewpoint of faceting of the represented subject matter, Le goûter is much more carefully constructed in relation to the overall shape of the picture frame. "Not only was this painting more unequivocally classical in its pedigree (and recognized as such by critics who instantly dubbed it 'La Joconde cubiste') than any of its now relatively distant sources in Picasso's oeuvre," writes David Cottington, "but in its clear if tacit juxtaposition, remarked on by Green and others, of sensation and idea—taste and geometry—it exemplified the interpretation of innovations from both wings of the cubist movement that Metzinger was offering in his essays of the time, as well as the paradigm shift from a perceptual to a conceptual painting that he recognized as now common to them."

The quiet atmosphere of Tea Time "seduces by means of the bridge it creates between two periods", according to Eimert and Podksik, "although Metzinger's style had already passed through an analytical phase, it now concentrated more on the idea of reconciling modernity with classical subjects".

A preparatory drawing for Tea Time (Etude pour 'Le Goûter'), 19 x 15 cm, is conserved in Paris at the Musée National d'Art Moderne – Centre Georges Pompidou.

== André Salmon, 1912 ==
Leonardo da Vinci, Mona Lisa (or La Joconde, La Gioconda), between 1503 and 1505, oil on poplar, 76.8 × 53 cm (30.2 × 20.9 in), Musée du Louvre, Paris

Following Louis Vauxcelles' sarcastic referral to Le goûter as "la Joconde à la cuiller" (Mona Lisa with a spoon) in the 30 September 1911 issue of Gil Blas, André Salmon elaborated, without sarcasm.

In his 1912 Anecdotal History of Cubism André Salmon writes:

Jean Metzinger and Robert Delaunay painted landscapes planted with cottages reduced to the severe appearance of parallelepipeds. Living less of an interior life than Picasso, remaining to all outward appearances more like painters than their precursor, these young artists were in a much greater hurry for results, though they be less complete. [...]

Exhibited, their works passed almost unobserved by the public and by art critics, who ... recognized only the Fauves, whether it be to praise or to curse to them.

Now, the king of the Fauves ... Henri Matisse ... with one word cast out Jean Metzinger and Robert Delaunay from the family. With that feminine sense of the appropriate, the basis of his taste, he baptized the cottages of the two painters, "Cubist." An ingenuous or ingenious art critic was with him. He ran to his newspaper and with style wrote the gospel article; the next day the public learned of the birth of Cubism. (André Salmon, 1912)

In L'Art Vivant Salmon quotes a statement made by Metzinger in defense of himself and Picasso: 'Before us, no painter had the desire to feel the objects he painted' ["Avant nous, aucun peintre n'avait eu le souci de palper les objets qu'il peignait"] (Jean Metzinger). What Metzinger probably refers to is that unlike the artists before them, he and Picasso move around their models and subjects, capturing not just one vision but many, capturing the full essence of their subject matter, if not all of its characteristics and properties. "Palper", or to 'palpate the objects' is more than just 'feel', it is to examine or explore by touch, a method of examination in which the artist feels size or shape or firmness or location of something, it implies volume, it involves a sense, just as taste. This text can also be found in André Salmon on French Modern Art, translated as: "We have never had the curiosity to touch the objects we were painting." This translation of Metzinger's statement is obviously erroneous, implying nearly the exact opposite of what was meant in the original French.

Also in L'Art Vivant, André Salmon writes about Le Goûter: 'It was Metzinger who attempted and was tempted by freedom. Savant in grace, he exhibited a painting we named the Mona Lisa of Cubism' ["C'est Metzinger qui tenta et que tenta la liberté. Savant en la grâce, il exposa une toile qu'on baptisa la Joconde du cubisme"].

In his 1920 essay, André Salmon again quotes Metzinger's statement: "Jamais, jusqu’a ce jour, les peintres n’avaient eu la curiosité de toucher les objets dont ils prétendaient traduire l’apparence". According to Salmon, Metzinger's reference to "touching" (toucher) the objects they attempted to represent, was a means by which to show all the sides, every aspect, each view-point, each element of the surface of the object simultaneously ("toutes les faces d'un objet à la fois").

== Multiple views ==
Jean Metzinger, 1911, Etude pour "Le Goûter", graphite and ink on paper, 19 x 15 cm, Musée National d'Art Moderne, Centre Georges Pompidou, Centre de création industrielle, Paris. Exhibited at the Cubist exhibition, Galeries Dalmau in Barcelona April–May 2012

Tea Time was meant, according to A. Miller "as a representation of the fourth dimension. [...] It is straight forward multiple viewing, as if the artist were moving around his subject." However, Du "Cubisme" written the following year does not mention the fourth dimension explicitly. 'To establish pictorial space', write Metzinger and Gleizes, 'we must have recourse to tactile and motor sensations, indeed to all our faculties. It is our whole personality, contracting or dilating, that transforms the plane of the picture. Since in reaction this plane reflects the viewer's personality back upon his understanding, pictorial space may be defined as a sensible passage between two subjective spaces'.

Le Goûter was hailed as a breakthrough... "and opened the eyes of Juan Gris to the possibilities of mathematics", wrote Richardson (1996). Principally due to the repercussions of Tea Time, Metzinger's publications and his high-profile status at the Salon d'Automne and Salon des Indépendants (and in the general absence of Picasso and Braque from large public exhibitions), he became the leader of the Cubist movement (simultaneously as a painter, theorist, spokesperson and writer). The showing at the 1911 Salon d'Automne prompted Salmon to refer to Metzinger as "the young prince of Cubism".

"There is certainly a parallel to be drawn," writes the art historian Peter Brooke in a letter to Miller, "between Einstein's attempt to reconcile the different viewpoints from which mathematical calculations can be made ('all reference points') and the multiple perspective of the Cubists, attempting to establish what Metzinger called (in 1910) a 'total image'. In both cases, however," Brooke continues, "what was achieved was not the longed for reconciliation of the conventions but simply the addition of another convention—very short-lived in the case of the artists.

The idea of walking round an object to see it from different angles is treated in Du "Cubisme" as just another convention. Miller takes this as the central theme in Du "Cubisme" (p.258). The concept of observing a subject from different points in space and time simultaneously (multiple or mobile perspective) "to seize it from several successive appearances, which fused into a single image, reconstitute in time" was also developed by Metzinger in his 1911 article, and to some extent in an article entitled Note sur la peinture, published in Pan, 1910. As Brooke points out, "although it is certainly one of the central ideas in Metzinger's 1910 Note sur la Peinture, in Du "Cubisme" its just treated as another convention which has shocked the public but which the public will eventually come to accept.

== Creative intuition (and taste) ==
Page from the periodical Fantasio, 15 October 1911, featuring Portrait de Jacques Nayral by Albert Gleizes (1911) and Le goûter (Tea Time) by Jean Metzinger

Pictorial space has been transformed by the artist into the temporal flow of consciousness. Quantity has morphed into quality, creating a 'qualitative space', "the pictorial analogue", write Antliff and Leighten, "to both time and space: temporal heterogeneity and the new geometries." In accord with this view of pictorial space, Metzinger and Gleizes encouraged artists to discard classical perspective and replace it with creative intuition. "Creative intuition is manifest in an artist's faculty of discernment, or 'taste', which coordinates all other sensations." Antliff and Leighten continue, "As we have seen Metzinger celebrated this faculty in Le Gouter, and Apollinaire advised artists to rely on their 'intuition' in The Cubist Painters (1913)."

Metzinger's interests in proportion, mathematical order, and his emphasis on geometry, are well documented. But it was his personal taste (gout in French) that sets Metzinger's work apart from both the Salon Cubists and those of Montmartre. While taste in Tea Time was denoted by one of the five senses, it was also connoted (for those who could read it) as a quality of discernment and subjective judgement. Le gouter translates to 'afternoon snack' but also alludes to 'taste' in an abstract sense. This painting, writes Christopher Green, "can seem the outcome of a meditation on intelligence and the senses, conception and sensation. The word in French for tea-time is "le goûter"; as a verb. "goûter" refers to the experience of tasting.

A page from the periodical Fantasio, 15 October 1911, by Roland Dorgelès, features Portrait de Jacques Nayral by Albert Gleizes (1911) and Le goûter (Tea Time) by Jean Metzinger, juxtaposed with images of unidentified models, the man with his knees crossed and a book on his lap, the woman (clothed) holding a spoon and a tea cup, as if the sitters. The commentary is heavily ironic, with the headline reading Ce que disent les cubes... (What the cubes say...).

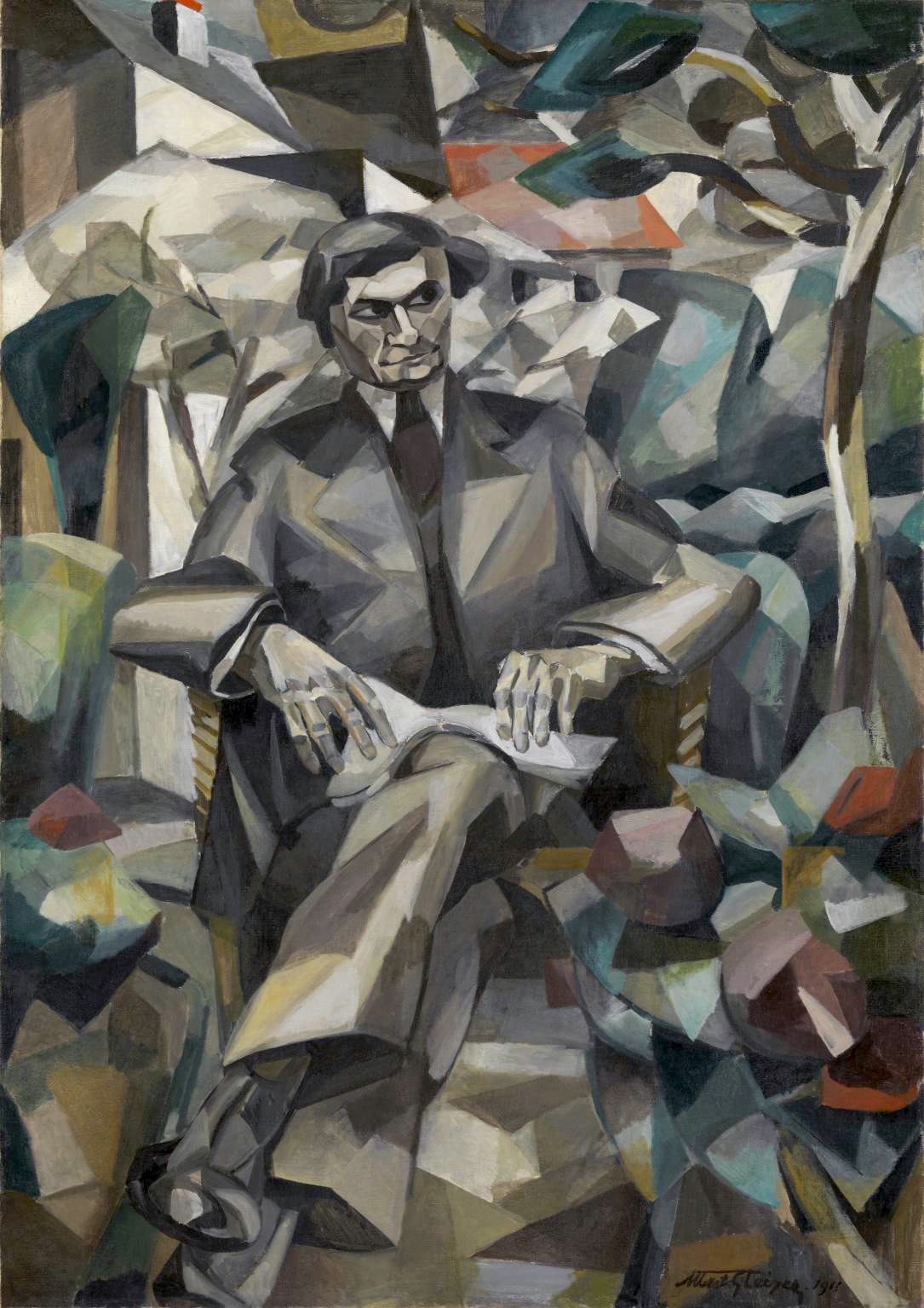
Albert Gleizes, 1911, Portrait de Jacques Nayral, oil on canvas, 161.9 x 114 cm, Tate, London. This painting was reproduced in Fantasio: published 15 October 1911, for the occasion of the Salon d'Automne where it was exhibited the same year. Also exhibited at Salon de ‘La Section d'Or’, Galerie La Boëtie, Paris, October 1912

The complex forms that defined Metzinger's paintings of the period serve to suggest the underlying imagery (e.g., a nude, a horse, a dancer, a café-concert), rather than define the imagery; arousing the viewer's own creative intuition to decipher the 'total image.' This meant too, inversely, that the creative intuition of the artist would be aroused. No longer did the artist have to define or reproduce, painstakingly, the subject matter of a painting. The artist became to a large extent free, libre, to place lines, shapes, forms and colors onto the painting according to his or her own creative intuition.

A similar concept lies behind Albert Gleizes' portrait of his friend, neo-Symbolist writer Joseph Houot, pen name Jacques Nayral, who in 1912 would marry Mireille Gleizes, the sister of Albert Gleizes. Along with Metzinger's Tea Time, Gleizes' Portrait de Jacques Nayral, painted the same year, exemplifies ideas and opinions formulated between 1910 and 1911 that would soon be codified in Du "Cubisme" (1912). According to Gleizes, both the content and form in this painting were the result of mind associations as he completed the work from memory; something that would play a crucial role in the works of other Cubists, such as Fernand Léger, Robert Delaunay and Francis Picabia. More so than an 'objective' view of the real-world, Jacques Nayral valorized subjective experience and expression. He embraced an anti-rationalist and anti-positivist world-view, consistent with concepts that underscored Cubist philosophies. Nayral's interest in philosophy led him to correspond with Henri Bergson, someone who would greatly inspire both Metzinger and Gleizes. Nayral's related interest in avant-garde art led him to purchase Metzinger's large 1912 oil on canvas entitled La Femme au Cheval, also known as Woman with a Horse (Statens Museum for Kunst, Copenhagen). Nayral's association with Gleizes led him to write the Preface for the Cubist exhibition at Galeries Dalmau in Barcelona (April–May 2012).

The following edition of Fantasio (1 November 1911) began with "A Consultation at the Salon d'Automne" by Roland Catenoy; a suppository report of a walk around the Grand Palais accompanied by two medical men who offer their 'diagnosis' of the paintings on display. A climax is attained in the presence of Metzinger's Le goûter: a "cubisticall nude woman" who presents all the symptoms of "lithopocdion", otherwise only previously seen in petrified fetuses; she is beyond treatment and close to death."

"These two responses to Metzinger and the other Cubists at the 1911 Automne have one theme in common:" writes Green et al., "the absurdity of the gap between Cubist painting and appearance. Just as Louis Vauxcelles made the Cubists' repudiation of "current vision" (appearances in nature) the crux of his attacks, so most of the jokes in the press at the expense of Cubism centered on the question of likeness. If Metzinger's Tea-Time was not like its sitter, what could it mean? Surely nothing."

Guillaume Apollinaire reviewing the Cubist room at the Salon d'Automne of 1911 (in L'Intransigeant) writes: 'Gleizes shows us the two sides of his great talent: invention and observation. Take the example of Portrait de Jacques Nayral, there is good resemblance, but there is nothing [not one form or color] in this impressive painting that has not been invented by the artist. The portrait has a grandiose appearance that should not escape the notice of connoisseurs.'

== Gleizes on Tea Time ==
In his memoirs, Albert Gleizes writes of the structure of Tea Time:

'The construction of his painting turns on the orchestration of these geometrical volumes, which shift their position, develop, interweave following the movements in space of the painter himself. Already we can see, as a consequence of this movement introduced into an art which, we were told, had no relation to movement, a plurality of perspective points. These architectural combinations of cubes supported the image as it appears to the senses, that of a woman whose torso is naked, holding in her left hand a cup while with the other hand she lifts a spoon to her lips. It can be easily understood that Metzinger is trying to master chance, he insists that each of the parts of his work must enter into a logical relationship with all the others. Each should, precisely, justify the other, the composition should be an organism as rigorous as possible and anything that looks accidental should be eliminated, or at least kept under control. None of that prevented either the expression of his temperament or the exercise of his imagination.' (Albert Gleizes)

== The total image ==
Jean Metzinger, 1911, Le Goûter, Tea Time (left), and Juan Gris, 1912, Hommage à Pablo Picasso (right)

Peter Brooke writes of Metzinger's Tea-Time: "The whole is inscribed in a beautifully constructed armature of straight lines and curves whose relation to each other is not determined by the figuration (the woman enjoying her tea) but interweaves with it in a manner that is entirely intelligible. We can see clearly how the lines interact with each other."

In A Life of Picasso, John Richardson writes that Tea-Time persuaded Juan Gris of the importance of mathematics (numbers) in painting. As Brooke points out, Gris started painting persistently in 1911 and first exhibited at the 1912 Salon des Indépendants (a painting entitled Hommage à Pablo Picasso). "He appears with two styles", writes Brooke, "In one of them a grid structure appears that is clearly reminiscent of the Goûter and of Metzinger's later work in 1912."

Roger Allard remarked that the general public viewing the works Metzinger, Gleizes and Le Fauconnier at the Salon d'Automne of 1910 found the "deformation of lines" less humorous than the "deformation of color", except with regards to the human face. Christopher Green writes that the "deformations of lines" allowed by mobile perspective in the head of Metzinger's Tea-time and Gleizes's Jacques Nayral "have seemed tentative to historians of Cubism. In 1911, as the key area of likeness and unlikeness, they more than anything released the laughter." Green continues, "This was the wider context of Gris's decision at the Indépendants of 1912 to make his debut with a Homage to Pablo Picasso, which was a portrait, and to do so with a portrait that responded to Picasso's portraits of 1910 through the intermediary of Metzinger's Tea-time.

Just before the 1911 Salon d'Automne—Metzinger had already placed the last brushstroke of paint of Tea Time—Gleizes published a major article about Metzinger, within which he argued that 'representation' was fundamental, but that Metzinger's intention was 'to inscribe the total image'. This total image 'combined the evidence of perception with 'a new truth, born from what his intelligence permits him to know'. Such 'intelligent' knowledge, writes Green, "was the accumulation of an all-round study of things, and so it was conveyed by the combination of multiple viewpoints in a single image." He continues, "This accumulation of fragmented aspects would be given 'equilibrium' by a geometric, a 'cubic' structure. Metzinger's Tea-time, a work that attracted much attention at the Salon d'automne of 1911, is like a pictorial demonstration of Gleizes's text. Multiple perspectives and a firm overall geometric structure (almost a grid) take control of a near pornographic subject: 'intelligence' subdues the senses."

== Criticism ==
Jean Metzinger, 1911, Étude pour Le Goûter (Study for Tea Time), Exposició d'Art Cubista, Galeries J. Dalmau (detail of page from catalogue), Barcelona, 20 April–10 May 1912

The Cubists had become by 1911 a legitimate target for critical disdain and satirical wit. "The cubists play a role in art today analogous to that sustained so effectively in the political and social arena by the apostles of anti-militarism and organized sabotage" wrote the critic Gabriel Mourney in his review of the Salon d'Automne of 1911 for Le Journal, "so doubtless the excesses of the anarchists and saboteurs of French painting will contribute to reviving, in artists and amateurs worthy of the name, the taste for true art and true beauty."

Claude of Le Petit Parisien accused the salon cubists of arrivisme, Janneau for Gil Blas questioned the sincerity of the cubists, and Tardieu in Echo de Paris condemned "the snobbery of the gullible which applauds the most stupid nonsenses of the arts of painting presented to idiots as the audacities of genius."

Henri Guilbeaux, reviewing the 1911 Indépendants for Les Hommes du jour described the paintings of Metzinger, Léger and others as 'grotesque, ridiculous, intended to bewilder—it would appear—the bourgeoisie', paintings 'whose cubes, cones and pyramids pile up, collapse and ... make you laugh.'

Vauxcelles, perhaps more so than his fellow critics, indulged in witty mockery of the salon Cubists: 'But in truth, what honor we do to these bipeds of the parallelepiped, to their lucubrations, cubes, succubi and incubi'. Vauxcelles was more than just skeptical. His comfort level had already been surpassed with the 1907 works of Matisse and Derain, which he perceived as perilous, 'an uncertain schematization, proscribing relief and volumes in the name of I know not what principle of pictorial abstraction.'

His concerns deepened in 1909 as the work of Le Fauconnier, Delaunay, Gleizes and Metzinger emerged as a unifying force. He condemned 'the frigid extravagances of a number of mystificators' and queried: 'Do they take us for dupes? Indeed are they fooled themselves? It's a puzzle hardly worth solving. Let M. Metzinger dance along behind Picasso, or Derain, or Bracke [sic] ... let M. Herbin crudely defile a clean canvas – that's their mistakes. We'll not join them ...'

A medical doctor, author of an article in Chroniques Médico-Artistique, Le Sabotage Anatomique au Salon d'Automne, Paris, 1911, writes:

Believe for a moment with certain advocates of Cubism whose good faith would be worse than the posturing [roublardise], that this is an excellent workshop exercise; when these gentlemen have finished their stretching [assouplissements], then show us the result; it is with this hope that we can cast an eye on Le Goûter of M. Metzinger; when this eruption of cobblestones [pavés] will have been forgotten [passée] thanks to a harsh winter and to a good destructive fire, perhaps will we have one more talented painter!

=== Salon d'Automne of 1911 ===
Jean Metzinger's Le goûter (Tea Time), published in Le Journal, 30 September 1911

Paintings by Henri Le Fauconnier, 1910–11, L'Abondance, Haags Gemeentemuseum; Jean Metzinger, 1911, Le goûter (Tea Time), Philadelphia Museum of Art; Robert Delaunay, 1910–11, La Tour Eiffel. Published in La Veu de Catalunya, 1 February 1912

In Room 7 and 8 of the 1911 Salon d'Automne, held 1 October through November 8, at the Grand Palais in Paris, hung works by Metzinger (Le goûter), Henri Le Fauconnier, Fernand Léger, Albert Gleizes, Roger de La Fresnaye, André Lhote, Jacques Villon, Marcel Duchamp, František Kupka, Alexander Archipenko, Joseph Csaky and Francis Picabia. The result was a public scandal which brought Cubism to the attention of the general public for the second time. The first was the organized group showing by Cubists in Salle 41 of the 1911 Salon des Indépendants (Paris), with Metzinger, Delaunay, le Fauconnier and Léger.

Apollinaire took Picasso to the opening of the exhibition in 1911 to see the Cubist works in Room 7 and 8.

Reviewing the Salon d'Automne of 1911, Huntly Carter in The New Age writes that "art is not an accessory to life; it is life itself carried to the greatest heights of personal expression." Carter continues:

It was at the Salon d'Automne, amid the Rhythmists, I found the desired sensation. The exuberant eagerness and vitality of their region, consisting of two room remotely situated, was a complete contrast to the morgue I was compelled to pass through in order to reach it. Though marked by extremes, it was clearly the starting point of a new movement in painting, perhaps the most remarkable in modern times, It revealed not only that artists are beginning to recognise the unity of art and life, but that some of them have discovered life is based on rhythmic vitality, and underlying all things is the perfect rhythm that continues and unites them. Consciously, or unconsciously, many are seeking for the perfect rhythm, and in so doing are attaining a liberty or wideness of expression unattained through several centuries of painting. (Huntly Carter, 1911)

In his review of the 1911 Salon d'Automne published in L'Intransigeant, written more as a counterattack in defense of Cubism, Guillaume Apollinaire expressed his views on the entries of Metzinger and Gleizes:

The imagination of Metzinger gave us this year two elegant canvases of tones and drawing that attest, at the very least, to a great culture... His art belongs to him now. He has vacated influences and his palette is of a refined richness. Gleizes shows us the two sides of his great talent: invention and observation. Take the example of Portrait de Jacques Nayral, there is good resemblance, but there is not one form or color in this impressive painting that has not been invented by the artist. The portrait has a grandiose appearance that should not escape the notice of connoisseurs. This portrait covers [revêt] a grandiose appearance that should not elude connoisseurs... It is time that young painters turn towards the sublime in their art. La Chasse, by Gleizes, is well composed and of beautiful colors and sings [chantant].

== Provenance ==
- R. Auclair, Paris, in 1912
- Possibly Pierre Faure, Paris, by 1930
- Unidentified dealer, c. 1936; sold to Louise and Walter C. Arensberg, Los Angeles, through Marcel Duchamp as agent, 1936
- Gift to PMA, 1950. 1. A. Gleizes and J. Metzinger, Du Cubisme, Paris, 1912, repro. (as exhibition Salon d'Automne; collection M[onsieur] R. Auclair); G. Apollinaire, Les peintres cubistes, Paris, 1913, repro. (same information). "R. Auclair" may be a pseudonym. 2. A painting by Metzinger entitled "Le goûter" ("Le goûter" was the title by which "Tea Time" was commonly known in its earlier history) was lent by Faure for exhibition at de Hauke & Co., NY, in April 1930. The dimensions listed in the de Hauke & Co. exhibition logbook, 29 1/2 x 27 3/4 in., match the PMA painting closely. See Archives of American Art, Jacques Seligmann & Co. Records / Series 9.4 / Box 406 / f. 8/ De Hauke & Co., Inc. Records/ Exhibition Files: Logbooks, 1930–1932 (copy in curatorial file). The "Créateurs de cubisme" (Beaux-Arts, Paris, 1935, catalog by Raymond Cogniat), also lists a painting, no. 136, entitled "Le goûter," belonging to Pierre Faure. Faure may have purchased the painting through Léonce Rosenberg, his usual dealer. However, this painting is dated 1912, while the Arensberg painting is inscribed with the date 1911. In addition, the Faure painting measurements are given as 68 x 68 cm., while the Arensberg painting is rectangular, measuring 75.9 x 70.2 cm. 3. Duchamp's provenance notes dated September 8, 1951, record that it was purchased "from dealer, 1936", probably a Paris dealer, as most of Duchamp's purchases were made there (PMA, Arensberg Archives).

== See also ==
- List of works by Jean Metzinger

== Literature ==
- Paris médical : la semaine du clinicien, 1911, n° 04, partie paramédicale, Edition : Paris : J.-B. Baillière et fils, 1911 (repro.)
- Fantasio, 15 October 1911, Albert Gleizes, Portrait of Jacques Nayral, Jean Metzinger, Le Gouter, Tea Time, 1911
- Jean Metzinger and Albert Gleizes, Du "Cubisme", Edition Figuière, Paris, 1912 (First English edition: Cubism, Unwin, London, 1913
- Arthur Jerome Eddy, Cubists and Post-impressionism, Metzinger's Le goûter is reproduced and entitled The Taster, A.C. McClurg & Co. Chicago, 1914, second edition 1919. A large portion of this book was based on information that Eddy obtained from the artists themselves. It is considered to be the first work published in the United States in which Modern Art was presented and explained sympathetically.
- Guillaume Apollinaire, Les peintres cubistes, Méditations esthétiques (The Cubist Painters, Aesthetic Meditations) Edition Figuière, Paris, 1913
- Guillaume Apollinaire, Dorothea Eimert, Anatoli Podoksik, Le Cubisme, ISBN 978-1-84484-750-1
- Jean Luc Daval, Journal de l'art moderne, 1884-1914: texte, notices explicatives, déroulement synoptique à travers le témoignage des contemporains, Skira, 1973
- Joann Moser, Daniel Robbins, Jean Metzinger in retrospect, 1985, The University of Iowa Museum of Art (J. Paul Getty Trust, University of Washington Press)
- Mark Antliff, Patricia Dee Leighten, Cubism and Culture, Thames & Hudson, 2001
- Didier Ottinger, Le futurisme à Paris: une avant-garde explosive, exhibition, Centre Pompidou, Galerie 1–15 October 2008 au 26 janvier 2009, Éditions du Centre Pompidou, 2008
- Anne Ganteführer-Trier, Uta Grosenick, Cubism, 2004, p. 58
- David Cottington, Cubism and Its Histories, 2004, p. 150
- Christopher Green, Art in France, 1900–1940, 2003, p. 93
- Markman Ellis, Richard Coulton, Matthew Mauger, Empire of Tea: The Asian Leaf that Conquered the World (Modernist Tea Time), 2015
- Arthur J. Miller, Einstein, Picasso: Space, Time and the Beauty That Causes Havoc, 2002, pp. 167–8
- Jewel Spears Brooker, Joseph Bentley, Reading "The Waste Land": Modernism and the Limits of Interpretation, 1992, p. 31
- Christopher Green, Christian Derouet, Karin von Maur, Juan Gris : [Whitechapel Art Gallery, London, 18 September – 29 November 1992] : [Staatsgalerie Stuttgart, 18 December 1992 – 14 February 1993] : [Rijksmuseum Kröller-Müller, Otterlo, 6 March – 2 May 1993], 1992, pp. 115–16
- Shannon Robinson, Cubism, 2006, p. 23
- Julius Thomas Fraser, Of Time, Passion, and Knowledge: Reflections on the Strategy of Existence, 1990, p. 406
- Karel Vollers, Twist & Build: Creating Non-orthogonal Architecture, 2001, p. 48
- Joel Katz, Designing Information: Human Factors and Common Sense in Information Design, 2012, p. 68
- Milton A. Cohen Movement, Manifesto, Melee: The Modernist Group, 1910–1914, 2004
- Guy Habasque, Cubism: Biographical and Critical Study, 1959, p. 93
- Murray Michael, John O'Leary-Hawthorne, Philosophy in Mind: The Place of Philosophy in the Study of Mind, 2012,
- David and Alfred Smart Museum of Art, Sue Taylor, Richard A. Born, The David and Alfred Smart Museum of Art: a guide to the Collection, 1990, p. 109
- Ian Chilvers, John Glaves-Smith, A Dictionary of Modern and Contemporary Art, 2009, p. 458
- John Ives Sewall, A history of Western art, 1961 p. 887
- Cynthia Maris Dantzic, Design dimensions: an introduction to the visual surface, 1990, p. 72
- Warren Sylvester Smith, The Arts: Text Book and Study Guide, 1976, p. 8
- Paul Greenhalgh, The modern ideal: the rise and collapse of idealism in the visual arts from the enlightenment to postmodernism, 2005, p. 220
- John D. Erickson, Dada: Performance, Poetry, and Art, 1984, p. 23
- Neil Cox, Cubism, 2000, p. 220
- Patricia Pate Havlice, World Painting Index: Titles of works and their painters, 1995, p. 1765
- Fabio Benzi, Il futurismo, 2008, p. 72
- John Canaday. Actaeon and the Atom: Art in the Contemporary World, 1960, pp. 17, 72
- La natura della natura morta. Da Manet ai nostri giorni. Ediz. inglese, An exhibition catalog of still-life paintings from the nineteenth and twentieth centuries. Electa, 2001, p. 255
- American Library Color Slide Company, Nahum Tschacbasov, Color slide source and reference of world art: (formerly, Teachers manual) for the study of art history and related courses : color slides in all media, architecture, sculpture, painting and the minor arts, from the Paleolithic to the present, 1980, p. 163
- Paul Waldo Schwartz, Cubism, 1971, p. 208
- John Canaday, Metropolitan Seminars in Art, 1960, p. 30
- W. Dorn, Jahrbuch der Wittheit zu Bremen - Volumes 19–21, 1975, p. 17
- David Hopkins, Marcel Duchamp and Max Ernst: The Bride Shared, 1998, p. 12
- Guillaume Apollinaire, Dorothea Eimert, Anatoli Podoksik, Le Cubisme, 2014
- Maria Tsaneva, Juan Gris: 121 Masterpieces, 2014, Forward
- Patricia Leighten, The Liberation of Painting: Modernism and Anarchism in Avant-Guerre Paris, 2013, p. 107
- John Richardson, Marilyn McCully, A Life of Picasso: 1907–1917, 1996, p. 211
- David Ohana, The Futurist Syndrome, 2010, p. 23
- B. Indurkhya, Metaphor and Cognition: An Interactionist Approach, 2013, p. 50
- John Golding, Cubism: a history and an analysis, 1907–1914, 1968, p. 159
- Mark Antliff, Patricia Leighten, A cubism reader: documents and criticism, 1906–1914, 2008, p. 126
- Art Institute of Chicago, Louise Arensberg, Walter Arensberg, 20th Century Art, from the Louise and Walter Arensberg Collection, October 20 to December 18, 1949, 1949, p. 30
- Claire Maingon, L’âge critique des salons : 1914-1925: L’école française, la tradition et l’art moderne, 2014, p. 32
- Pierre Daix, Picasso: Life and Art, 1993, p. 110
- Bernard Blistène, A history of 20th-century art, 2001, p. 37
- Museum of Fine Arts, Houston, Texas, Bulletin, Volumes 4–6, 1970, p. 18
- Kazimir Severinovich Malevich, Troels Andersen, Essays on Art: 1928–1933, 1968, p. 171
- Molly Nesbit, Their Common Sense, 2000, p. 118
- Museum of Art, Carnegie Institute: Collection Handbook, 1985, p. 140
- Burr Wallen, Donna Stein, UCSB Art Museum, The Cubist print, 1981, p. 85
- Bernard Dorival, Musée national d'art moderne, The School of Paris in the Musée d'art moderne, 1962, p. 156
- Université de Saint-Etienne, Le cubisme: Actes du premier Colloque d'histoire de l'art contemporain tenu au Musée d'art et d'industrie, Saint-Étienne, les 19, 20, 21 novembre 1971, 1973, p. 98
- Lilli Weissweiler, Futuristen auf Europa-Tournee: Zur Vorgeschichte, Konzeption und Rezeption der Ausstellungen futuristischer Malerei (1911-1913), 2015, p. 89
- L'Amour de l'art, Volumes 1–10, 1933, p. 217
- Georges Charbonnier, Le monologue du peintre: entretiens avec Bazaine, Braque, Brianchon ... [et al.], 1959, p. 77
- Béatrice Joyeux-Prunel, Nul n'est prophète en son pays?: l'internationalisation de la peinture des avant-gardes parisiennes, 1855-1914, 2009, p. 264
- Conseil des musées nationaux, La Revue des arts: Musées de France, Volume 10, 1960, p. 284
- René Huyghe, Jean Rudel, 1880–1920, 1970, p. 322
- André Lhote, La peinture libérée, 1956, p. 132
- Comité national de la gravure française, Nouvelles de l'estampe, Issues 181–186, 2002, p. 363
- Thompson, Forma e colore: i grandi cicli dell'arte, Issue 66, Pennsylvania State University, digitalized 2009
- Lara Vinca Masini, Picasso e il Cubismo, 1970, p. 14
- Presses universitaires de France, Que sais-je? Le Cubisme, Issue 1036, 1963, p. 49
- Que vlo-ve?: bulletin de l'Association internationale des amis de Guillaume Apollinaire, 2002, p. 41
- Van Kouteren, Art and Auctions, Volume 12, 1968, p. 2819
- Le Crapouillot, 1925, p. xx
- Albert Gleizes, Souvenirs, le cubisme, 1908-1914, 1957, p. 23
- Cahiers du Musée national d'art moderne, Issues 6–8, 1981, p. 88
- Douglas Cooper, The Cubist Epoch, Los Angeles County Museum of Art, Metropolitan Museum of Art (New York, N.Y.), 1971, p. 167
- Nathan Knobler, The visual dialogue; an introduction to the appreciation of art, New York, Holt, Rinehart and Winston, 1971, p. 61
