= Woman with a Horse =

Painting by Jean Metzinger

- La Femme au Cheval (French)
- Artist: Jean Metzinger
- Year: 1911–12
- Medium: Oil on canvas
- Dimensions: 162 cm × 130.5 cm (63.8 in × 51.2 in)
- Location: Statens Museum for Kunst, Copenhagen

Woman with a Horse (French: La Femme au Cheval, also known as L'Écuyère and Kvinde med hest) is a large oil painting created toward the end of 1911, early 1912, by the French artist Jean Metzinger (1883–1956). The work was exhibited in Paris at the Salon des Indépendants (20 March – 16 May) in 1912 and the Salon de la Section d'Or, 1912. The following year La Femme au Cheval was reproduced in The Cubist Painters, Aesthetic Meditations by Guillaume Apollinaire (1913).

The artist has broken down the picture plane into facets, presenting multiple aspects of the subject in succession and/or simultaneously. This concept first pronounced by Metzinger in 1910—since considered a founding principle of Cubism—would soon find its way into the foundations of the Copenhagen interpretation of quantum mechanics; the fact that a complete description of one and the same subject may require diverse points of view which defy a unique description. The painting was owned by the poet Joseph Houot (known as Jacques Nayral). In 1918 La Femme au Cheval was exhibited at International Kunst, Kleis Kunsthandel, Copenhagen, an exhibition arranged by Herwarth Walden.

It was presumably bought by a Danish collector in 1918. The painting was subsequently sold at auction through art dealer Kai Grunth hos Winkel & Magnussen, auction no. 108, 19 February 1932, lot no. 119. Purchased by Danish physicist Niels Bohr. After his death Woman with Horse was sold by his widow Margrethe Bohr (through Ernest Bohr) to the Statens Museum for Kunst in Copenhagen. It is now in the Royal Collection of Paintings and Sculpture at the museum.

== Description ==
La Femme au Cheval is an oil painting on canvas with dimensions 162 × 130.5 cm (63.8 × 51.4 in). As the title indicates the painting represents a woman and a horse. The rather elegant woman wearing only a pearl necklace and the horse are immersed in a landscape with trees and a window (in the 'background'), a vase, with fruits and vegetation (in the 'foreground') clearly taken from the natural world.

Roger Allard, in his review of the 1912 Salon des Indépendants, noted Metzinger's 'refined choice of colors' and the 'precious rarity' of the painting's 'matière'. André Salmon also noted Metzinger's 'refined use of color' in La Femme au Cheval and praised its 'French grace', while thanking Metzinger for having, for the first time, 'illuminated a cubist figure with the virtues of a smile'.

David Cottington wrote:

In the absence of more evidence than such brief snatches of commentary in wide-ranging salon reviews can provide, we can only speculate as to whether Metzinger intended, or its initial audience read, the provocative juxtaposition in this painting of a naked woman with horse, and of natural with cosmetic adornment, as a follow-up to Tea Time's essay on sensation and the viewer's apprehension of it.

After the clarity and measure of the demonstration piece that was Tea-Time, Metzinger reprised those qualities in the large Woman on a Horse, shown at the Indépendants of 1912. Through its fussy geometry we can discern a nude woman, her limbs and upper torso picked out in sensuous chiaroscuro, perched side-saddle on a studio prop-horse and stroking its mane (visible top right) . . .

The nude woman is in fact not perched side-saddle on the horse. As others have pointed out (Antliff and Leighten), and as emerges upon close examination, the nude woman is seated on what appears to be a rectangular block or cube, perhaps a model's pedestal (visible to the left). The horse occupies the upper right-hand quadrant as if observed from above. Its head is turned toward the monumental nude while she strokes the horse's right ear with her left hand. She cups her hand underneath the horse's mouth, as if feeding the horse a piece of fruit.

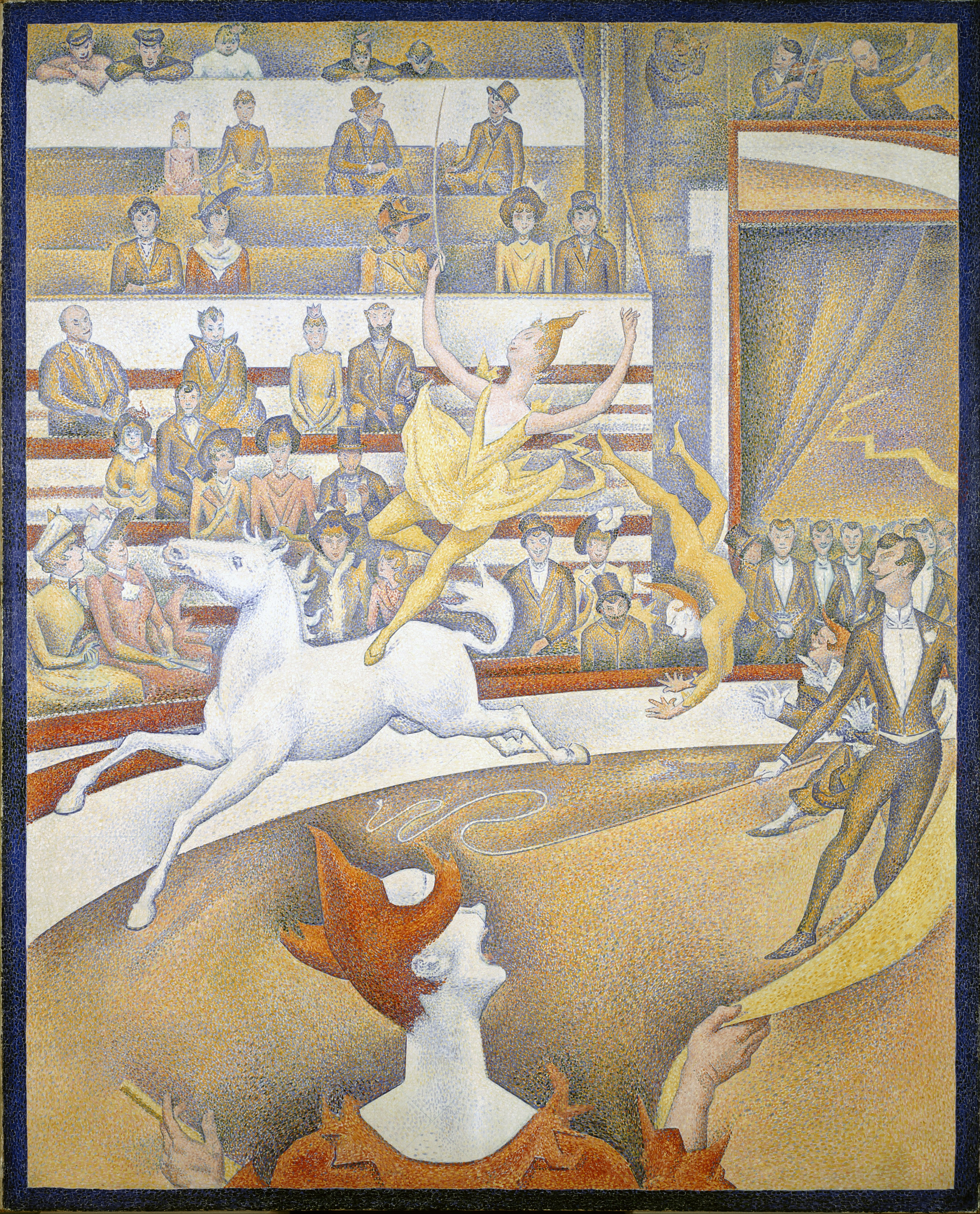
Georges Seurat, 1891, Le Cirque (The Circus), oil on canvas, 185 x 152 cm, Musée d'Orsay, Paris

The reconstruction of the total image was left, according to Metzinger, to 'creative intuition' of the observer. While one viewer may see a woman riding a horse, another may see her sitting beside the horse, and yet others may not see a horse at all. That there even exists such ambiguity with respect to what is transpiring on the canvas is remarkable. According to the founders of Cubist theory, objects possess no absolute or essential form. "There are as many images of an object as there are eyes which look at it; there are as many essential images of it as there are minds which comprehend it."

The nude figure sitting to the left, the horse standing to the right, along with other elements of the painting, are depicted in a faceted manner, based to some extent on non-Euclidean geometry. Denying the illusion of Renaissance perspective the artist breaks down the figures and background into facets and planes, presenting multiple aspects of the subject all at once. This can be seen in the deliberate positioning of light, shadow, form and color, in the way in which Metzinger assimilates the union of the background, woman and horse. For example, the division of the model's features generates a subtle profile view, the vase is shown both from above and the side.

The resulting free and mobile perspective, 'simultaneity' of multiple view-points, was used by Metzinger to constitute the image of a whole—one that includes the fourth dimension—what he called 'total image'.

== Background: color, form and motion ==
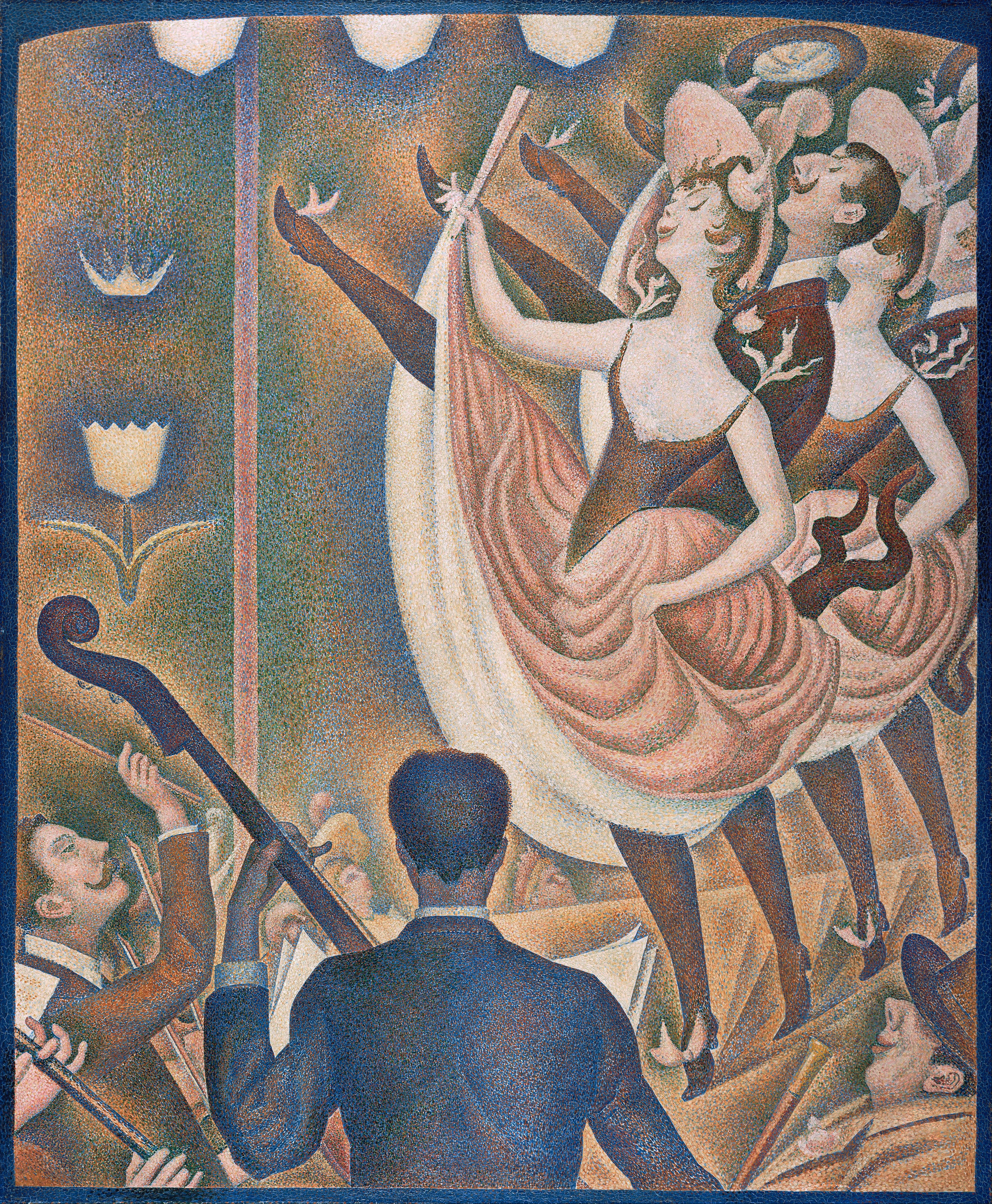
Georges Seurat, 1889–90, Le Chahut, oil on canvas, 171.5 x 140.5 cm (66 7/8 x 54 3/4 in), Kröller-Müller Museum, Otterlo, Netherlands

Where the dialectic nature of Paul Cézanne's work had been influential between 1908 and 1910 during the expressionistic phase of Cubism, the flat, linear structures of Georges Seurat would capture the attention of the Cubists from 1911. In addition to the flattened depth of field, the colors (subtle blues, raw umber and burnt sienna) employed in La Femme au Cheval bear a resemblance to the colors of Seurat's 1889–90 Le Chahut and his 1887–88 Parade de Cirque.

"With the advent of monochromatic Cubism in 1910–1911," Robert Herbert writes, "questions of form displaced color in the artists' attention, and for these Seurat was more relevant. Thanks to several exhibitions, his paintings and drawings were easily seen in Paris, and reproductions of his major compositions circulated widely among the Cubists. The Chahut (Kröller-Müller Museum, Otterlo) was called by André Salmon "one of the great icons of the new devotion", and both it and the Circus (Musée d'Orsay, Paris), according to Apollinaire, "almost belong to Synthetic Cubism".

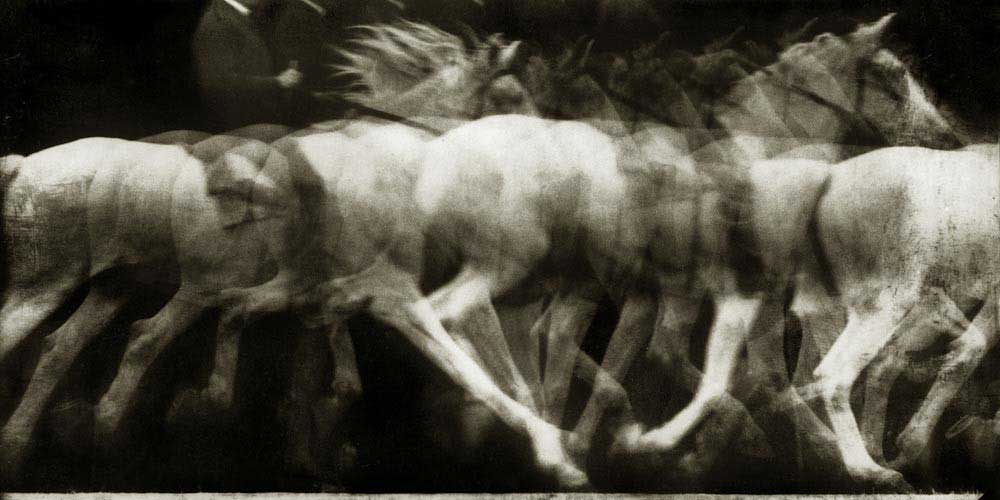
Étienne-Jules Marey, Cheval blanc monté, 1886, locomotion du cheval, expérience 4, Chronophotographie sur plaque fixe.

Eadweard Muybridge, Sallie Gardner at a Gallop, 1878, Galloping horse, animated using 24 still photographs: one of the production experiments that led to the development of motion pictures.

In the composition, Metzinger depicts motion, not of the subject matter as the Futurists relative to the observer, but by successive superimposed images captured by the artist in motion relative to (or around) the subject matter. The Chronophotography of Eadweard Muybridge and Étienne-Jules Marey that directly influenced Marcel Duchamp's 1912 Nu descendant un escalier n° 2 could also be read into Metzinger's work of 1911–12, though here, rather than simultaneously superimposing successive images to depict the motion of the horse, Metzinger represents a horse at rest viewed from multiple angles; the dynamic role is played by the artist.

Eadweard Muybridge's sequential photography of movements broken down frame by frame produced in the late 19th century depicting horses at a gallop and nudes descending a staircase, were known in Europe at the beginning of the 20th century. Muybridge often traveled to Europe to promote his work and he met Étienne-Jules Marey in 1881. His freeze-framed images of galloping horses evoked time and motion. Displayed in a grid, the horse is captured in split-second intervals. Because the horse's movement was too fast for the human eye to register, there was a scientific debate in the 1870s questioning (Marey's hypothesis originally) whether all four hooves ever left the ground simultaneously. To prove that Marey was right Muybridge (in Palo Alto, California) carried out his "Photographic Investigation". His photographs settled the debate, though skeptics remained. 'Many people didn't believe it,' Brookman writes, 'They thought they were fake because the horse looked so strange'.

In an interview with Katherine Kuh, Marcel Duchamp spoke about his 1912 Nude Descending a Staircase and its relation to the photographic motion studies of Muybridge and Marey:

"In 1912... the idea of describing the movement of a nude coming downstairs while still retaining static visual means to do this, particularly interested me. The fact that I had seen chronophotographs of fencers in action and horse galloping (what we today call stroboscopic photography) gave me the idea for the Nude. It doesn't mean that I copied these photographs. The Futurists were also interested in somewhat the same idea, though I was never a Futurist. And of course the motion picture with its cinematic techniques was developing then too. The whole idea of movement, of speed, was in the air."

== Mobile perspective, 1909–1911 ==
Rather than depicting the subject matter classically, from one point of view, Metzinger has used a concept of 'mobile perspective' to portray the subject from a variety of angles. The images captured from multiple spatial view-points and at successive time intervals are shown simultaneously on the canvas.

The anti-Hellenic concept of representing a subject from multiple view-points was a central idea of Jean Metzinger's Note sur la Peinture, 1910. Indeed, prior to Cubism painters worked from the limiting factor of a single view-point. And it was Jean Metzinger, for the first time in Note sur la peinture who enunciated the stimulating interest in representing objects as remembered from successive and subjective experiences within the context of both space and time. In that article, Metzinger writes about the works of Robert Delaunay, Henri Le Fauconnier, Georges Braque and Pablo Picasso, noting that they "discarded traditional perspective and granted themselves the liberty of moving around objects." All four, according to Metzinger, held in common the notion of simultaneity. This is the concept of "mobile perspective" that would tend towards the representation of the "total image". Though he does not discuss his own work in Note sur la peinture, clearly at the time of writing he had already discarded classical perspective (Nu, Landscape and Nu à la cheminée (Nude), c. 1908, 1909 and 1910 respectively) turning his attention fully towards the geometric abstraction of form.

== Theoretical underpinnings, 1910–1912 ==
Jean Metzinger, 1912, Danseuse au café (Dancer in a café), oil on canvas, 146.1 x 114.3 cm, Albright–Knox Art Gallery, Buffalo, New York. Published in Au Salon d'Automne "Les Indépendants" 1912, Exhibited at the 1912 Salon d'Automne, Paris

The idea exemplified in La Femme au Cheval of moving around an object in order to see it from different view-points was elaborated upon in Du "Cubisme" (1912), written in collaboration with Albert Gleizes. In addition to being illustrated in Du "Cubisme", Metzinger's La Femme au Cheval is also reproduced in Les Peintres Cubistes by Guillaume Apollinaire, 1913.

Metzinger and Gleizes wrote with reference to non-Euclidean geometry in Du "Cubisme". It was argued that Cubism itself was not based on any geometrical theory, but that non-Euclidean geometry corresponded better than classical, or Euclidean geometry, to what the Cubsists were doing. The essential was in the understanding of space other than by the classical method of perspective; an understanding that would include and integrate the fourth dimension with 3-space.

The reconstruction of the total image was left to the creative intuition of the observer. The spectator now played an active role. Taken at face value, each of the constituent parts (the fragments or facets) are just as important as the whole. Yet, the total image, greater than the sum of the parts of which it is composed, now resides in the mind of the beholder. The dynamism of form implicit or explicit in the quantitative and qualitative properties of the work, set in motion by the artist, could be reassembled and understood in a dynamic process no longer solely restricted to the artist and subject matter.

Essentially, if the permutations and simultanism of Cubism was to be understood, the observer was left with no other option but to participate in the creative process. The other option resulted in the misunderstanding and alienation of the spectator. Albeit, the latter was not a viable option for Metzinger, whose intention had been to diffuse Cubism to a wider audience. At the same time, Metzinger new full well that to varying degrees a barrier would remain, insurmountable, between the exclusive intellectual geometric deliberations of Cubism practiced by the Section d'Or group and popular culture. "But we cannot enjoy in isolation" wrote the two principle theorists of Cubism in 1912, "we wish to dazzle others with that which we daily snatch from the world of sense, and in return we wish others to show us their trophies." This 'reciprocity' between artist and public is perhaps one of the reasons Metzinger felt the need to include elements of the real world into his paintings of the period, untouched by the wrath of mobile perspective. "The reminiscence of natural forms cannot be absolutely banished; not yet, at all events" wrote Metzinger and Gleizes, for art, to them, could not "be raised to the level of a pure effusion at the first step".

Woman with a Horse was conceived in such a way that the viewer is obliged to contemplate the manifold surface of the painting for an extended period of time, piecing together the recognizable forms, not just in space, but in time; due to the temporal evolution resulting from the act of moving around the subject (during the painting process). Only then do the more obscure structures become legible with the topological context of the multi-dimension space of the whole. The radical new concept based on non-conventional precepts of space and time transformed the canvas from something quasi-static to something that possessed dynamic evolutionary characteristics. No longer governed by Euclidean geometry (or classical Renaissance perspective), Metzinger's Woman with a Horse is composed of a series of ellipses, curvilinear and rectilinear structures and planes juxtaposed and distributed throughout the canvas in complex myriad combinations of abstract volumetric forms that suggest rather than define the underlying subject.

Though the rupture with the past seemed total, there was still within La Femme au Cheval something of the past. Metzinger, for example, writes in a Pan article, two years before the publication of Du "Cubisme" that the greatest challenge to the modern artist is not to 'cancel' tradition, but to accept "it is in us", acquired by living. It was the combination of the past with the present, and its progression into the future that most intrigued Metzinger:

Jean Metzinger, 1910, Nu à la cheminée (Nude). Exhibited at the 1910 Salon d'Automne. Published in Les Peintres Cubistes by Guillaume Apollinaire in 1913

"If we wished to relate the space of the [Cubist] painters to geometry, we should have to refer it to the non-Euclidean mathematicians; we should have to study, at some length, certain of Riemann's theorems."

The concept of observing a subject from different points in space and time simultaneously (multiple or mobile perspective) "to seize it from several successive appearances, which fused into a single image, reconstitute in time" developed by Metzinger (in his article, Cubisme et tradition, Paris Journal, 16 August 1911) and observed in La Femme au Cheval was not derived from Albert Einstein's theory of relativity, though it was certainly influenced in a similar way, through the work of Jules Henri Poincaré (particularly Science and Hypothesis). Poincaré's writings, unlike Einstein's, were well known leading up to 1912. Poincaré's widely read book, La Science et l'Hypothèse, was published in 1902 (by Flammarion).

The French mathematician Maurice Princet discussed the work of Poincaré, along with the concept of the fourth spatial dimension, to artists at the Bateau-Lavoir. He was a close associate of Pablo Picasso, Guillaume Apollinaire, Max Jacob, Marcel Duchamp and Jean Metzinger. Princet is known as "le mathématicien du cubisme". Princet brought to attention of these artists a book entitled Traité élémentaire de géométrie à quatre dimensions by Esprit Jouffret (1903) a popularization of Poincaré's Science and Hypothesis. In this book Jouffret described hypercubes and complex polyhedra in four dimensions projected onto a two-dimensional page. Princet was close to Metzinger and participated in meetings of the Section d'Or in Puteaux, giving informal lectures to the artists, many of whom were passionate about mathematical order. In 1910, Metzinger said of him, "[Picasso] lays out a free, mobile perspective, from which that ingenious mathematician Maurice Princet has deduced a whole geometry".

The similarity of Metzinger's own work of 1910 to that of Picasso is exemplified in his Nu à la cheminée (Nude), exhibited at the 1910 Salon d'Automne. The style of lips in both Metzinger's Nude and Picasso's Portrait of Wilhelm Uhde (spring-automn 1910) bear a resemblance to each other (both are in the form of an "X"). So too, both pictures merge the model with the environment, blurring the distinction between background and foreground. Metzinger, however—in addition to the simultaneous views and multiple perspective—has included the image of a clock in the upper right quadrant, a fact that reveals Metzinger's didactic visual and literary reference to Poincaré and Bergsonian 'duration'.

Reviewing the 1910 Salon d'Automne Roger Allard wrote of the 'new innovators':

"Metzinger's nude and his landscape are ruled by an equal striving for fragmentary synthesis. No usual cliché from the aesthetic vocabulary fits the art of this disconcerting painter. Consider the elements of his nude: a woman, a clock, an armchair, a table, a vase with flowers...such, at least, is an account of my personal inventory. The head whose expression is very noble is rendered formally, and the artist seems to have drawn back from the integral application of his law. [...] The analytical kinships among objects and their mutual subordinations will be henceforth of little importance", Allard continues, "since they will be suppressed in the painted realization. These come into play later, subjectively, in each individual's mental realization". (Allard, 1910)

What Allard means, according to art historian Daniel Robbins, is that in the treatment of the nude's head, Metzinger retreats from the bold ideas exhibited in the rest of the painting. "The importance of Allard's understanding of the genuine innovation visible at the salon is hard to overestimate." Robbins writes, "He goes well beyond Metzinger's emphasis in the Pan article on multiple points of view, that is, beyond the technical innovations of the new painting. He penetrates to its intellectual core: an art capable of synthesizing a reality in the mind of the observer...."

== Influence on quantum mechanics ==
Jean Metzinger, La Femme au Cheval, hanging in the office of Niels Bohr (the Danish physicist who made foundational contributions to understanding atomic structure and quantum mechanics, for which he received the Nobel Prize in Physics in 1922)

Arthur I. Miller, author of Einstein, Picasso: Space, Time and the Beauty that Causes Havoc (2002), writes: "Cubism directly helped Niels Bohr discover the principle of complementarity in quantum theory, which says that something can be a particle and a wave at the same time, but it will always be measured to be either one or the other. In analytic cubism, artists tried to represent a scene from all possible viewpoints on one canvas." Miller continues: "An observer picks out one particular viewpoint. How you view the painting, that’s the way it is. Bohr read the book by Jean Metzinger and Albert Gleizes on cubist theory, Du "Cubisme". It inspired him to postulate that the totality of an electron is both a particle and a wave, but when you observe it you pick out one particular viewpoint."

Niels Bohr (1885–1962), the Danish physicist and one of the principal founders of quantum mechanics, moved into a mansion owned by the Carlsberg Foundation (where he and his family resided after 1932) and was given unconditional authority to furnish it. For inspiration Bohr hung in his office a large painting by Jean Metzinger, La Femme au Cheval, one of Metzinger's most conspicuous early examples of 'mobile perspective' implementation (also called simultaneity). Bohr, vitally interested in the rapid changes taking place in modern art, took great pleasure talking about La Femme au Cheval and in giving "form to thoughts to an audience at first unable to see anything in Metzinger's painting—They came with a preconceived idea", according to the Danish artist and writer Mogens Andersen. His lectures had been meant to parallel "the lessons painfully learned by atomic physicists," writes Miller, "who realized the inadequacy of visual perception when they discarded the visual imagery of the solar system atom after 1923." To this problem Bohr developed a solution in 1927 with striking similarities to Metzinger's concept of multiple perspective: the principle of complementarity, which Bohr summarized as follows:

[...] the account of the experimental arrangements and of the results of the observations must be expressed in unambiguous language with suitable application of the terminology of classical physics. [...] Consequently, evidence obtained under different experimental conditions cannot be comprehended within a single picture, but must be regarded as complementary in the sense that only the totality of the phenomena exhausts the possible information about the objects.

Bohr was the first to point out the ‘indivisibility of the quantum of action’, his way of describing the uncertainty principle, implying that not all aspects of a system can be viewed simultaneously. For example, the wave–particle duality of physical objects are such complementary phenomena. Both concepts are borrowed from classical mechanics, i.e., measurements such as the double-slit experiment can demonstrate one or the other, but not both phenomena at a particular moment in time or position in space. It is impossible to empirically demonstrate both phenomena simultaneously.

This was perhaps the first manifestation of interest in Cubism on the part of a leading representative of the physics community. Bohr's interest in the new art, Miller notes, was anchored in the writings of Metzinger. He concludes: "If cubism is the result of the science in Art, the quantum theory is the result of art in science." In the epistemological words of Bohr, 1929:

...depending upon our arbitrary point of view...we must, in general, be prepared to accept the fact that a complete elucidation of one and the same object may require diverse points of view which defy a unique description. (Niels Bohr, 1929)

Within the context of Cubism, artists were forced into the position of re-evaluating the role of the observer. Classical linear and aerial perspective, uninterrupted surface transitions and chiaroscuro were pushed aside. What remained was a series of images obtained by the observer (the artist) in different frames of reference as the object was being painted. Essentially, observations became linked through a system of coordinate transformations. The result was Metzinger's 'total image' or a combination of successive images.

Jean Metzinger, 1911–12, Le Port (The Harbor). Exhibited at the 1912 Salon des Indépendants, Paris. Reproduced in Du "Cubisme", by Jean Metzinger and Albert Gleizes, 1912, and Les Peintres Cubistes Guillaume Apollinaire, 1913. Dimensions and current location unknown

In Metzinger's theory, the artist and the object being observed became equivocally linked so that the results of any observation seemed to be determined, at least partially, by actual choices made by the artist. "An object has not one absolute form; it has many," Metzinger wrote. Furthermore, part of the role of placing together various images was left to the observer (the one looking at the painting). The object represented, depending on how the observer perceives it, could have as many forms "as there are planes in the region of perception." (Jean Metzinger, 1912)

Where Metzinger dismantled the primacy of single-point perspective in favor of a simultaneity of views, Bohr dismantled the classical determinism of Newtonian mechanics in favor of a probabilistic, observer-dependent framework of reality. That Bohr acquired La Femme au Cheval and chose to hang it in his office at the Carlsberg Mansion—where he lived and worked from 1932 onward—speaks not merely to his appreciation of modern art, but to a deeper, more conceptual affinity. According to contemporary accounts, Bohr took pleasure in introducing visitors to the painting, often using it as a visual analogue for the "lessons painfully learned by atomic physicists" after the abandonment of the planetary model of the atom in 1923. As Mogens Andersen observed, Bohr delighted in confronting his audience’s assumptions, using Metzinger’s complex composition to initiate a conversation on perception, cognition, and the limits of visual epistemology. In this context, La Femme au Cheval was not merely décor, but a didactic tool—a visual thought experiment paralleling the ontological dilemmas at the heart of quantum mechanics.

== Salon des Indépendants, 1912 ==
The Salon des Indépendants transpired in Paris from 20 March to 16 May 1912. This massive exhibition occurred exactly one year after Metzinger, Gleizes, Le Fauconnier, Delaunay, Léger and Laurencin were shown together in Room 41 of the 1911 Salon des Indépendants, which provoked the scandal out of which Cubism emerged and spread throughout Paris with wide-ranging repercussions in Germany, the Netherlands, Italy, Russia, Spain and elsewhere (influencing Futurism, Suprematism, Constructivism, De Stijl and so on). Just five months prior to this show another polemic developed at the Salon d'Automne of 1912. Originating in Salle XI where the Cubists exhibited their works, this quarrel involved both the French and non-French avant-garde artists. On 3 December 1912 the polemic reached the Chambre des députés and was debated at the Assemblée Nationale. At stake was more than just the future of public funding for exhibitions that included Cubist art. Le Fauconnier, Gleizes, Léger, Metzinger and Archipenko formed the core of the hanging committee at the 1912 Indépendants. The common hall, room 20, in which the Cubists placed themselves became the nucleus of the exhibition.

At the Salon des Indépendants of 1912 Jean Metzinger exhibited La Femme au Cheval and Le Port (The Harbor, location unknown) – Fernand Léger showed La Noce (Musée National d'Art Moderne, Centre Georges Pompidou, Paris ) – Henri Le Fauconnier, Le Chasseur (The Huntsman, Museum of Modern Art, NY) – Robert Delaunay, exhibited his gigantic Ville de Paris (Musée d'Art Moderne de la Ville de Paris) – Albert Gleizes, entered a large painting entitled Les Baigneuses (Musée d'Art Moderne de la Ville de Paris) – and the newcomer Juan Gris exhibited his Portrait of Picasso (Art Institute of Chicago).

Roger Allard's reviewed the 1912 Salon des Indépendants in the March–April 1912 issue of La Revue de France et des Pays, noting Metzinger's 'refined choice of colors' and the 'precious rarity' of the painting's 'matière'. André Salmon too, in his review, noted Metzinger's 'refined use of color' in La Femme au Cheval and praised its 'French grace', while noting Metzinger 'illuminated a cubist figure with the virtues of a smile'.

== Exhibitions ==
- Salon de la Section d'Or, Galerie La Boétie, Paris, October 1912, no. 116
- International Kunst, Ekspressionister og Kubister, Malerier og Skulpturer', Kleis Kunsthandel, København 1918, cat. 82
- Avantgarde i dansk og europæisk kunst 1909–19, Statens Museum for Kunst, 7 September 2002 – 19 January 2003
- Picasso - Fortællinger fra Labyrinten, Sølvgade, 16 October 2010 – 27 February 2011
- The Avant-Gardes at War, Bundes Kunsthalle, Bonn, 8 November 2013 – 23 February 2014
- Le cubisme, 17 October 2018 – 25 February 2019, Galerie 1, Centre Pompidou, Musée National d'Art Moderne, Paris. Kunstmuseum Basel, 31 March – 5 August 2019

== Literature ==
- Jean Metzinger and Albert Gleizes, Du "Cubisme", Edition Figuière, Paris, 1912 (First English edition: Cubism, Unwin, London, 1913)
- Guillaume Apollinaire, Méditations esthétiques. Les peintres cubistes, Paris, 1913 (reproduced and listed with the provenance Jacques Nayral)
- Erik Zahle, Fransk maleri efter 1900, København 1938, p. 19f, ill. no. 34
- Inge Vibeke Raaschou-Nielsen, The ambiguous painting, København, 1997, pp. 126–135
- Mogens Andersen, Omkring kilderne, København 1967, 137–39
- Jean Metzinger in Retrospect, The University of Iowa Museum of Art (J. Paul Getty Trust, University of Washington Press) p. 29
- Guillaume Apollinaire, 1913, The Cubist Painters, translated, with commentary by Peter F. Read, 2002
- Dorthe Aagesen (Ågesen), The Avant-Garde in Danish and European Art, 1909–1919 (Avantgarde i dansk og europæisk kunst 1909–19), 2002, p. 124–133. Afb. p. 128, ISBN 8790096398
- Herman Feshbach, Tetsuo Matsui, Alexandra Oleson, Niels Bohr: Physics and the World, Routledge, May 9, 2014
- Arkady Plotnitsky, Niels Bohr and Complementarity: An Introduction, Springer Science & Business Media, Sep 5, 2012, p. 160
- Uwe M. Schneede, 1914. Die Avantgarden im Kampf, Bonn Köln, 2013
- Cécile Debray, Marcel Duchamp la peinture, même, Paris 2014, afb. p. 141

== See also ==
- Horses in art
- List of works by Jean Metzinger
