= Cubist Landscape =

Painting by Albert Gleizes

- Paysage cubiste (Arbre et fleuve) (French)
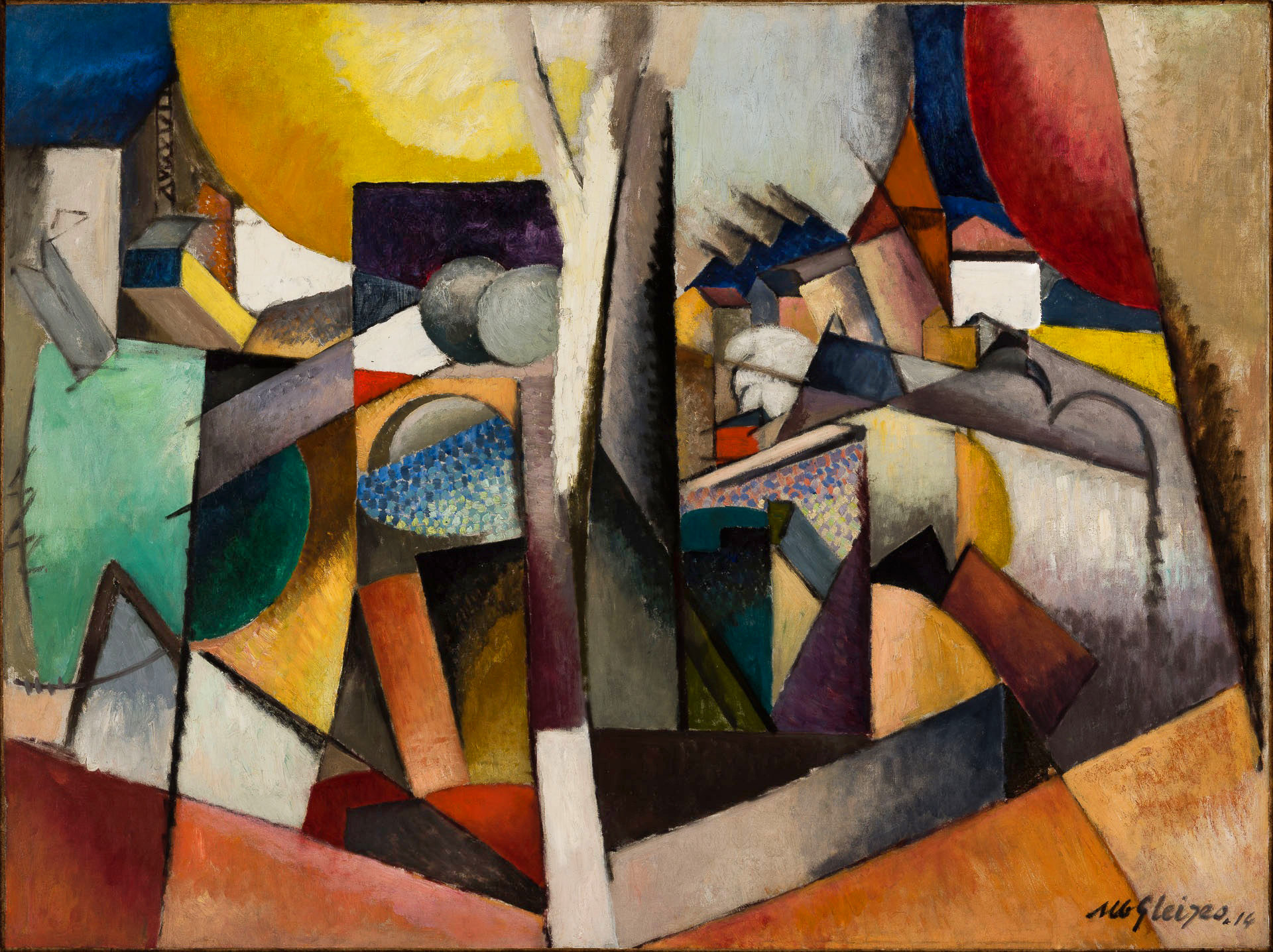
- Artist: Albert Gleizes
- Year: 1914
- Medium: Oil on canvas
- Dimensions: 97 cm × 130 cm (38.2 in × 51.2 in)
- Location: Private collection

Cubist Landscape, also referred to as Tree and River and Paysage cubiste or Arbre et fleuve, is a Cubist painting created in 1914 by the French artist Albert Gleizes. Tree and River is one of Gleizes' last pre-World War I landscapes. A comparison with earlier works such as Le Chemin, Paysage à Meudon (1911), Les Baigneuses (Gleizes) (1912), Harvest Threshing (1912) and Passy, Bridges of Paris (1912) demonstrates the artists' continuity with the theme of deep spatial vistas and wide panoramic views, though with a notable diminution of specific references to reality. The painting was reproduced in the German art and literary magazine Der Sturm (titled Baum und Fluss) October 1920.

== Description ==
Cubist Landscape is an oil painting on canvas in horizontal format with dimensions 97 cm × 130 cm (38 in × 51 in), signed and dated Alb Gleizes, 14, lower right. Executed in a Cubist style, the work is notable in its fusing of foreground and background, the multiple perspective—also called simultaneity or multiplicity, successive views at various moments in time of the elements—the freely flowing brushstrokes, and the dark lines and arcs delineating juxtaposing color planes or surfaces.

Art historian Daniel Robbins, in his Solomon R. Guggenheim Museum Gleizes Retrospective Exhibition catalogue writes of Gleizes' work during the period:

His work was always directly engaged with environment, especially an unfamiliar one... In the works from 1914 through the end of the New York period, paintings without subject and paintings with an evident visual basis exist side by side, their difference in degree of abstraction hidden by the uniformity with which they were painted and by the constant effort to tie the plastic realization of the painting to a specific, even unique, experience. In the absence of his individual reflexes, these unique references—no matter how neutral—seem less and less in accord with the generalized nature of his austere, flat painting style.

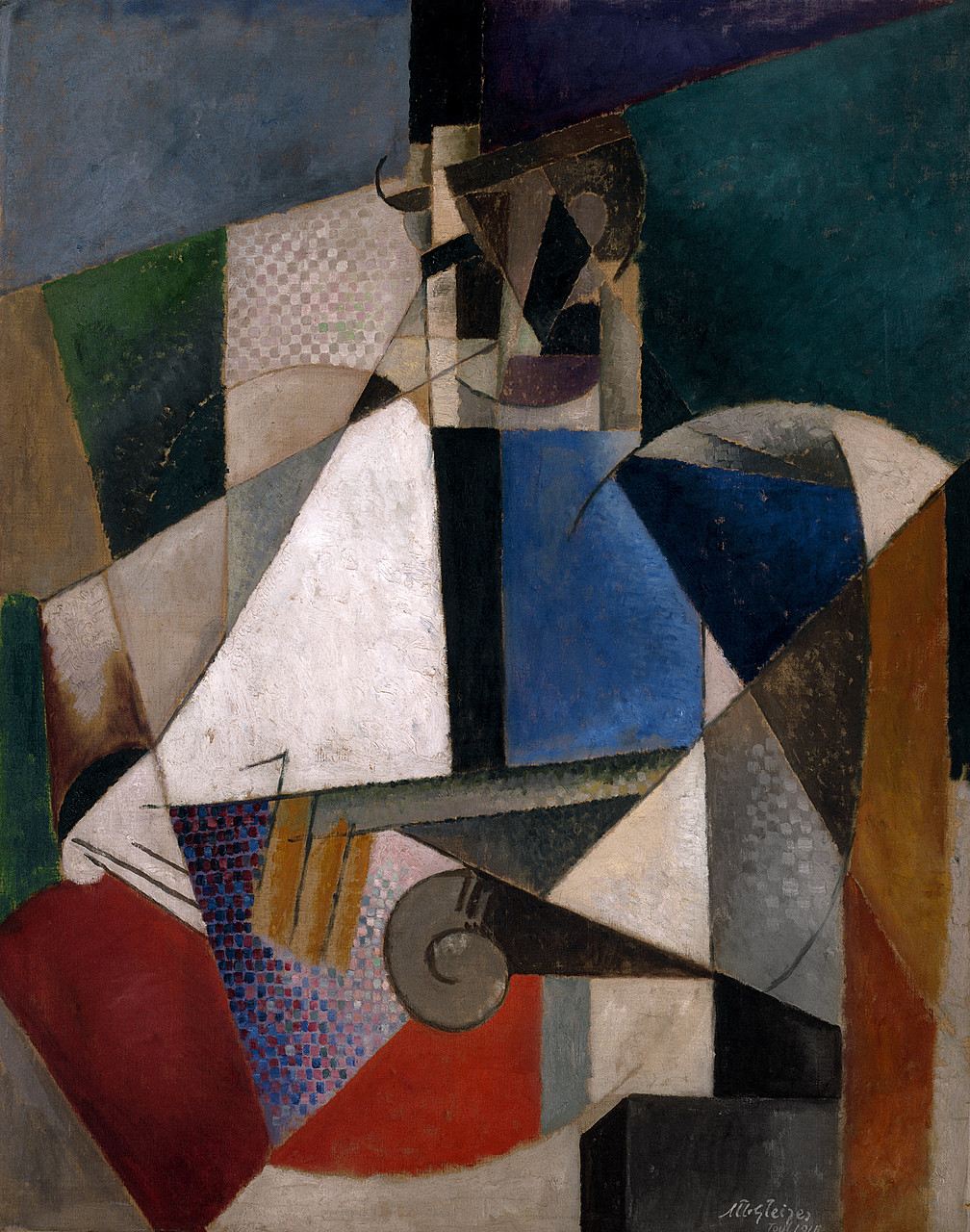
Albert Gleizes, 1914–15, Portrait of an Army Doctor (Portrait d'un médecin militaire), oil on canvas, 119.8 x 95.1 cm, Solomon R. Guggenheim Museum

With regard to structural composition, Cubist Landscape and other works closely related, are of critical importance, as their rhythms anticipate Gleizes' vital principles of translation and rotation (tilting planes and circular movements).

Rhythm and space, for Gleizes, are two vital conditions. Rhythm is a consequence of the continuity of certain phenomena, variable or invariable, following from mathematical relations. Space is a conception of the human psyche that follows from quantitative comparisons. This mechanism, according to Gleizes, is the foundation for artistic expression. It is therefore both a philosophical and scientific synthesis. Cubism was a means to arrive not only at a new mode of expression but above all a new way of thinking. This was, according to art historian Pierre Alibert, the foundation of both a new species of painting and an alternative relationship with the world; hence another principle of civilization.

== See also ==
- List of works by Albert Gleizes
