= List of works by Albert Gleizes =

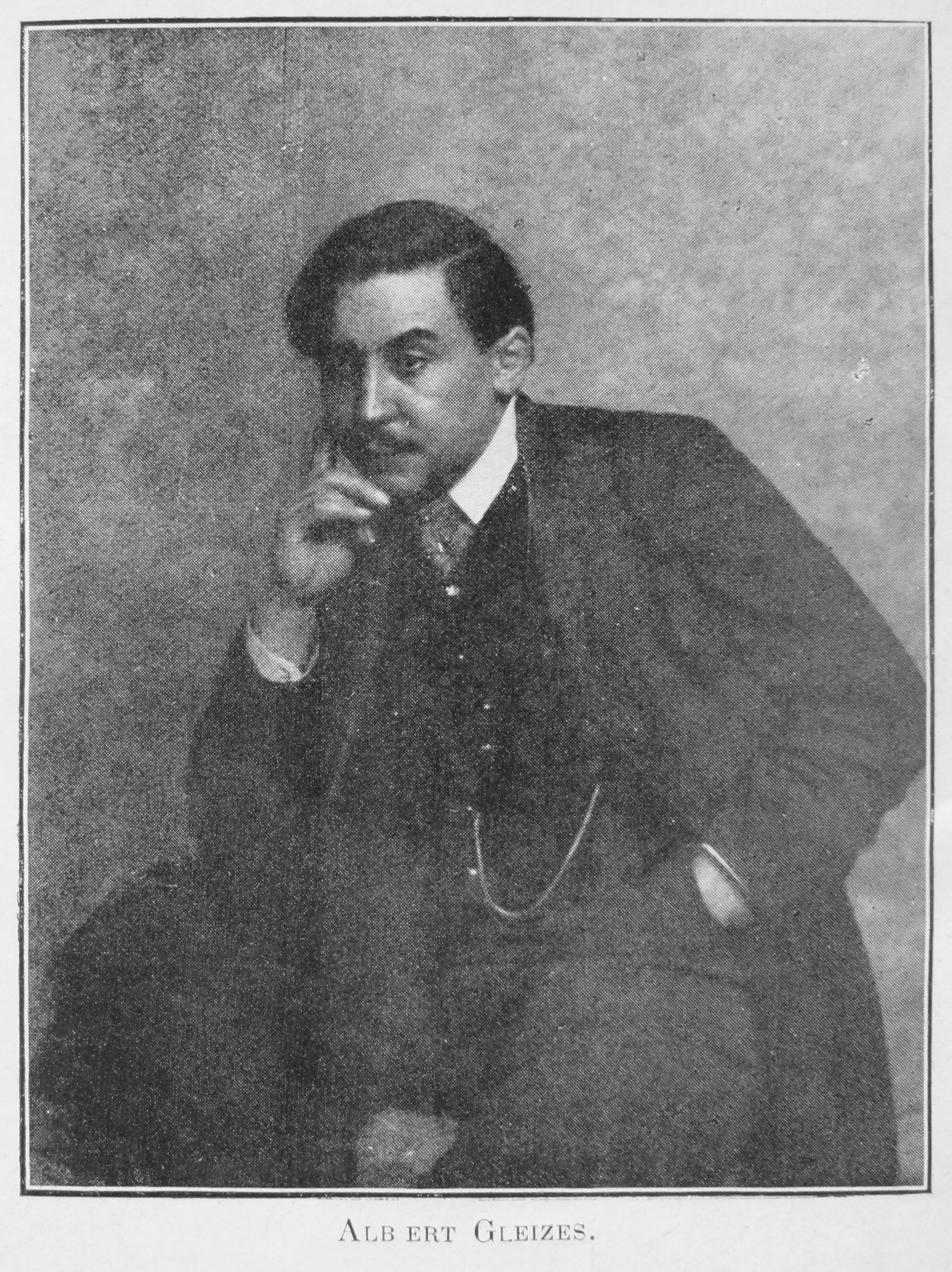
Albert Gleizes, circa 1912

This is a list of works by the French artist, theoretician, philosopher Albert Gleizes; one of the founders of Cubism and an influence on the School of Paris.

The artistic career of Gleizes spanned more than fifty years, from roughly 1901 to the year of his death in 1953. He was both a prolific painter and writer. This incomplete list is a selection of some of Gleizes' better-known oil paintings, or includes those for which images are available. Also listed is an extensive selection of his writings; both books and articles.

"Gleizes' individual development, his unique struggle to reconcile forces," writes the art historian Daniel Robbins, "made him one of the few painters to come out of Cubism with a wholly individual style, undeflected by later artistic movements. Although he occasionally returned to earlier subjects... these later works were treated anew, on the basis of fresh insights. He never repeated his earlier styles, never remained stationary, but always grew more intense, more passionate. [...] His life ended in 1953 but his paintings remain to testify to his willingness to struggle for final answers. His is an abstract art of deep significance and meaning, paradoxically human even in his very search for absolute order and truth." (Daniel Robbins, 1964)

== Paintings ==
Image	Title	Year	Dimensions	Museum	Country
	Paysage	1902	53 × 64 cm	Fondation Albert Gleizes	Paris
	Le marché d'Abbeville	1903	73 × 60 cm	Private collection	
	Jour de marché en banlieue, Courbevoie	1905	54 × 65 cm	Musée des Beaux-Arts de Lyon	Lyon
	Barque dans la Seine	1908	54 × 65 cm	Musée Roybet-Fould	Courbevoie
	Jour de marché à Bagnères-de-Bigorre	1908	60 × 73 cm	Musée des Beaux-Arts de Lyon	Lyon
	Bords de la Marne	1909	54 × 65 cm	Musée des Beaux-Arts de Lyon	Lyon
	Homme dans un Hamac	1909	50 x 64.7 cm	Albright-Knox Art Gallery	Buffalo, New York
	Nu assis	1909	73 × 61 cm	Musée de Petit Palais Geneve	Switzerland
	Portrait d'homme (Olivier Gleizes)	1909	65 × 53.5 cm	Private collection	
	Paysage classic	1910	50 × 65 cm	Private collection	
	L'Arbre (The Tree)	1910	92 × 73.2 cm	Private collection	
	La Femme aux Phlox (Woman with Phlox)	1910	81 × 100 cm	The Museum of Fine Arts	Houston
	Les Arbres	1910 or 1912	41 × 27 cm	Private collection	
	Paris, les quais	1910	54 × 65.2 cm	Private collection	
	René Arcos	1910	60.3 × 38.3 cm	Private collection	
	Femme a la cuisine (Woman in the kitchen)	1911	118.5 × 94.5 cm	Gallery ASADA	
	La Chasse (The Hunt)	1911	123.2 × 99 cm		
	Le Chemin (Paysage à Meudon)	1911	146.4 × 114.4 cm	Private collection	
	Portrait de Jacques Nayral	1911	161.9 x 114 cm	Tate Modern	London
	Paysage (Landscape)	1911	71 × 91.5 cm	Location unknown	
	Nature Morte (Stilleben) Still Life	1911	Dimensions unknown	Location unknown	
	La Cathédrale de Chartres	1912	73.6 × 60.3 cm	Sprengel Museum	Hannover
	Landscape (Paysage)	1912	37.5 × 43.3 cm	Solomon R. Guggenheim Museum	New York
	Paysage près de Paris, Paysage de Courbevoie (Landschaft bei Paris)	1912	72.8 × 87.1 cm	Missing from Hannover Germany since 1937	
	Harvest Threshing (Le Dépiquage des Moissons)	1912	269 × 353 cm	National Museum of Western Art	Tokyo
	Les Baigneuse (The Bathers)	1912	105 × 171 cm	Musée d'Art Moderne de la Ville de Paris	
	Les Pont de Paris (The Bridges of Paris, Passy)	1912	58 × 72.5 cm	Museum Moderner Kunst (mumok)	Vienna
	Dessin pour L'Homme au balcon	1912		Exhibited Salon des Indépendants 1912	
	Man on a balcony (l'Homme au Balcon)	1912	195.6 × 114.9 cm	Philadelphia Museum of Art	
	Moissonneurs, Dépiquage des Moissons (Variante)	1912	149 × 89 cm	Private collection	
	Port marchand	1912	90 × 116.5 cm	Art Gallery of Ontario	Toronto
	Les Joueurs de football	1912-13	225.4 × 183 cm	National Gallery of Art	Washington DC
	Portrait (Head in Landscape)	1912-13	37.6 × 50.4 cm	Solomon R. Guggenheim Museum	New York
	Femmes cousant	1913	185.5 × 126 cm	Kröller-Müller Museum	Otterlo, the Netherlands
	Drawing for Head in Landscape (Dessin pour Tête dans un paysage)	1913	12.7 × 15.6 cm	Solomon R. Guggenheim Museum	New York
	L'Homme au Hamac (Man in a Hammock)	1913	130 × 155.5 cm	Albright-Knox Art Gallery	Buffalo, New York
	La Ville en fleuve	1913	76 × 63 cm	Private collection	
	Les Bateaux de pêche (Fischerboote)	1913	165 × 111 cm	Tel Aviv Museum of Art	
	Paysage avec moulin (Paisaje con molino)	1913	101 × 81.6 cm	Museo Nacional Centro de Arte Reina Sofía	Madrid
	Landscape with a Windmill	1913	56.5 × 39.4 cm	Private collection	
	Portrait de l'éditeur Figuière (The Publisher Eugene Figuiere)	1913	143 × 102 cm	Musée des beaux-arts de Lyon	Lyon
	Woman with animals (Madame Raymond Duchamp-Villon, La dame aux bêtes)	1913-14	196.4 × 114.1 cm	Peggy Guggenheim Collection	Venice
	Femmes assises à une fenêtre	1914	Private collection	New York	
	Cubist Landscape (Paysage cubiste, Arbre et fleuve)	1914	97 x 130 cm	Public auction, 3 December 2008	Paris
	Paysage cubiste	1914	66 × 81.3 cm	Private collection	
	Paysage près de Montreuil	1914	73 × 92.5 cm	Saarland Museum	Saarbrücken, Germany
	Paysage	1914	73.3 × 92.3 cm	Yale University Art Gallery	New Haven
	Portrait of Igor Stravinsky	1914	129.5 × 114.3 cm	Museum of Modern Art	New York
	Woman at the piano	1914	146.4 × 113.7 cm	Philadelphia Museum of Art	Philadelphia
	Paysage avec un arbre (Landscape with Tree)	1914	100 × 81 cm	Private collection	
	Paysage (New York)	1914-15	102 × 102 cm	Collection Alain Delon	Switzerland
	Portrait of an Army Doctor (Portrait d'un médecin militaire)	1914-15	119.8 × 95.1 cm	Solomon R. Guggenheim Museum	New York
	Portrait de Florent Schmitt (Le Pianiste)	1914-15	36 × 27 cm	Location unknown	
	Portrait de Florent Schmitt	1914-15	200 × 152 cm	Private collection	
	Le Chant de guerre (Portrait de Florent Schmitt)	1915	101 × 101 cm	Musée National d'Art Moderne	Paris
	Musician (Florent Schmitt) (Un Musicien [Florent Schmitt])	1915	59.7 × 44.5 cm	Solomon R. Guggenheim Museum	New York
	Retour de Bois-le-Prêtre	1915	39 x 50 cm		
	Chal Post	1915	101.8 × 76.5 cm	Solomon R. Guggenheim Museum	New York
	Broadway	1915	98.5 x 76 cm	Private collection	
	Composition for "Jazz" (Composition pour "Jazz")	1915	73 × 73 cm	Solomon R. Guggenheim Museum	New York
	Broadway	1915	98.5 × 76 cm	Private collection	New York
	Brooklyn Bridge	1915	102 × 102 cm	Solomon R. Guggenheim Museum	New York
	Brooklyn Bridge	1915	25 × 19 cm	Los Angeles County Museum of Art (LACMA)	California
	Brooklyn Bridge	1915	148.1 × 120.4 cm	Private collection	
	Pyrénées	c.1915	64 × 80 cm	Israel Museum	Jerusalem
	The Astor Cup Races (Flags), (Le prix de la coupe Astor, Les Drapeaux)	1915	99.4 × 74.4 cm	Solomon R. Guggenheim Museum	New York
	New York	1916	92 x 71.4 cm	Private collection	
	Danseuse	1916	57 × 36 cm	Private collection	
	Acrobates (Les Acrobates)	1916	120.6 × 84.5 cm	National Gallery of Victoria	Melbourne, Australia
	Circus Equestrienne (Sur une écuyère de haute école)	1916	101.8 × 76.2 cm	Solomon R. Guggenheim Museum	New York
	On a Sailboat	1916		New Orleans Museum of Art	
	Portrait de Jean Cocteau	1916	116 × 79.5 cm	Fundación Telefónica	
	Spanish Dancer (Danseuse espagnole)	1916	101.3 × 76.4 cm	Solomon R. Guggenheim Museum	New York
	Street Scene in Bermuda	1917	80.6 × 65.4 cm	Metropolitan Museum of Art	New York
	Bermuda	1917	81 × 64.5 cm	Private collection	
	Des clowns	oil and sand on canvas	1917	103 × 76 cm	Musée d'Art Moderne de la Ville de Paris
	Le Port (En el puerto)	1917	153 × 120 cm	Thyssen-Bornemisza Museum	Madrid
	Paysage (Les Bermudes)	1917	92 × 73 cm	Musée National d'Art Moderne	Paris
	On Brooklyn Bridge (Sur Brooklyn Bridge)	1917	161.8 × 129.5 cm	Solomon R. Guggenheim Museum	New York
	To Jacques Nayral	1917	75.8 × 65 cm	Columbus Museum of Art	Columbus Ohio
	Kelly Springfield	1919	102 × 76.5 cm	Solomon R. Guggenheim Museum	New York
	Femme au gant noir (Woman with Black Glove)	1920	126 × 100 cm	National Gallery of Australia	
	Espace rythmé selon le plan	1920		Museum of Grenoble	Grenoble
	Figure	1920	91.4 x 76.2 cm	Los Angeles County Museum of Art	Los Angeles
	Cover of Action, vol. 1, no. 1	1920			
	Ecuyère (Horsewoman)	1920-1923	130 × 93 cm	Musée des Beaux-Arts de Rouen	Rouen
	Busto de mujer	1920	80 × 60 cm	Galería Barbié Barcelona	Spain
	L’Ecolier	1920	92x 73 cm	Musée Cantini	Marseille
	Figures planes (Trois personnages assis)	c.1920	126 × 100 cm (approximate)		
	Femme et enfant (Woman and child, Frau und Kind)	1920		Published in Der Sturm, 5 October 1921	
	Untitled	c.1920		Published in Broom, An International Magazine Of The Arts, November 1921	
	Seated Woman	c.1920	92 × 73 cm	The Israel Museum	Jerusalem
	Composition bleu et jaune (Composition jaune)	1921	200.5 × 110 cm		
	Composition	1922	81 × 59.5 cm	Ursulines Museum	Mâcon
	Madame Gleizes a la Tocque	1922	73 × 60 cm	Private collection	
	Peinture à Sept Eléments Rythmés	1924-34	216 × 181 cm	Musée National d'Art Moderne	Paris
	Figure Imaginaire	1924	160 × 69 cm	Private collection	
	Composition with Seven Elements (Les sept elements)	1924–1925	143.5 × 103.5 cm	Private collection	
	Le Centre noir	1925	268.5 × 354 cm	Museum of Fine Arts of Lyon	Lyon
	Composition	1928	94 × 70 cm	Stolen by the nazis	Poland (missing)
	Descent from the Cross	1928	30 × 35.6 cm	Cleveland Museum of Art	Ohio
	Panel for the room of Jacqueline Rosenberg	1930–1931	115 × 90 cm	Musée National d'Art Moderne	Paris
	Composition	1930–1931	160 × 100.5 cm	Musée d'Art Moderne de la Ville de Paris	Paris
	Symphony in Violet	1930–1931	196 × 131 cm	Private collection	Switzerland
	Composition with Seven Elements (Les sept elements)	1924–1934	260 × 108 cm	Musée National d'Art Moderne	Paris
	Composition for Meditation	1932–1934	75.5 × 124.5 cm	Private collection	
	Lumière (Light)	1932–1934	112 × 78 cm	Private collection	
	Composition Rythmique (Les Bleus)	1932–1934	135.9 × 96.5 cm		
	Femme et Enfant	1932–1934	166 × 105 cm	Private collection	
	Spiral brun et vert	1932–1934	168.2 × 77.7 cm	Private collection	
	Support de Contemplation	1932–1934	141 × 111 cm	Musée des Beaux-Arts du Palais Carnolès	Menton
	Maternité, Mère et enfant	1934	168 × 105 cm	Musée Calvet, Musée des Beaux-Arts et d'Archéologie d'Avignon	Avignon
	Elément central de Sept Eléments	1935–1936	170 × 85 cm	Private collection	
	Femme et Enfant	1935	99 × 75 cm	Private collection	
	Crucifixion	1935	137 × 92 cm	Musée des Beaux-Arts de Dijon	Dijon
	Terre et Ciel	1935	145 × 145 cm	Musée des Beaux-Arts de Lyon	Lyon
	Mother and Child	1936	139.4 × 84.5 cm	Private collection	
	Composition	1937-38	250 × 165 cm	Musée National d'Art Moderne	París
	Pour l'esprit, Les verts, Composition	1939	183 × 148 cm	Private collection	
	Contemplation	1942	217 × 132 cm	Private collection	
	Supports de Contemplation	1942	217 × 132 cm	Musée des Beaux-Arts de Lyon	Lyon
	Portrait of Mrs. Walter Fleisher	1943–1944	208 × 132 cm	Private collection	
	Painting with seven elements	1943	300 × 178 cm	Private collection	
	Contemplation	1944	212 × 132 cm	Musée National d'Art Moderne	Paris
	Contemplation	1944	212 × 132 cm	Private collection	
	L'Etrange Musicien	1944	181 × 111 cm	Private collection	
	Composition	1945	183 × 110 cm	Private collection	
	L'Etrange musicien, 2eme état	1945	175 × 85 cm	Private collection	
	Support de contemplation	1947	208.7 × 132.8 cm	Musée des Beaux-Arts de Lyon	Lyon
	Composition bleue	1948	44.5 × 36.2 cm	Private collection	
	Arabesques	1951–1953	76 × 60 cm	Musée des Beaux-Arts de Lyon	Lyon
	Composition, La Libellule	1952	80 × 57 cm	Fondation Albert Gleizes	Paris

== After Albert Gleizes ==
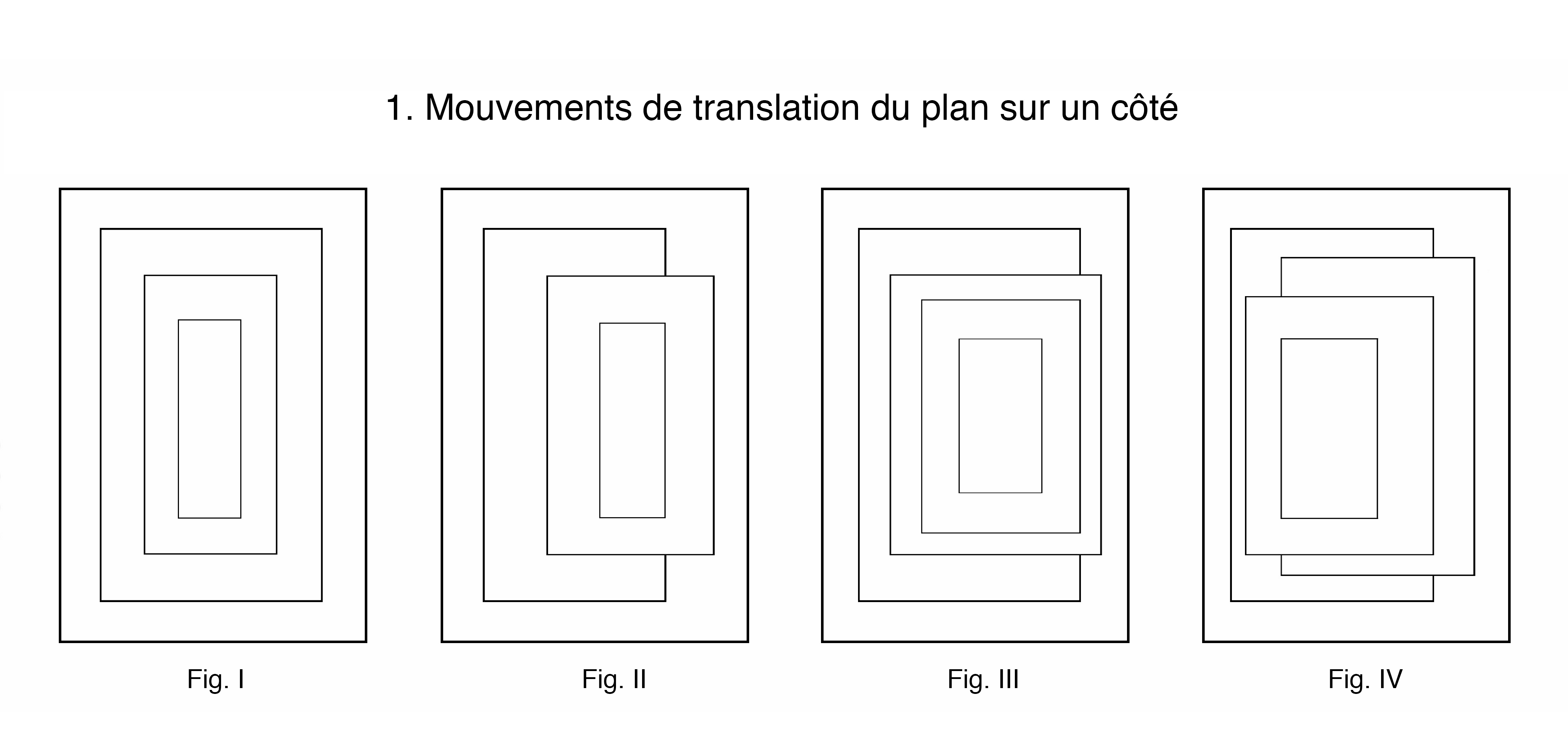
1. Movements of translation of the plane to one side

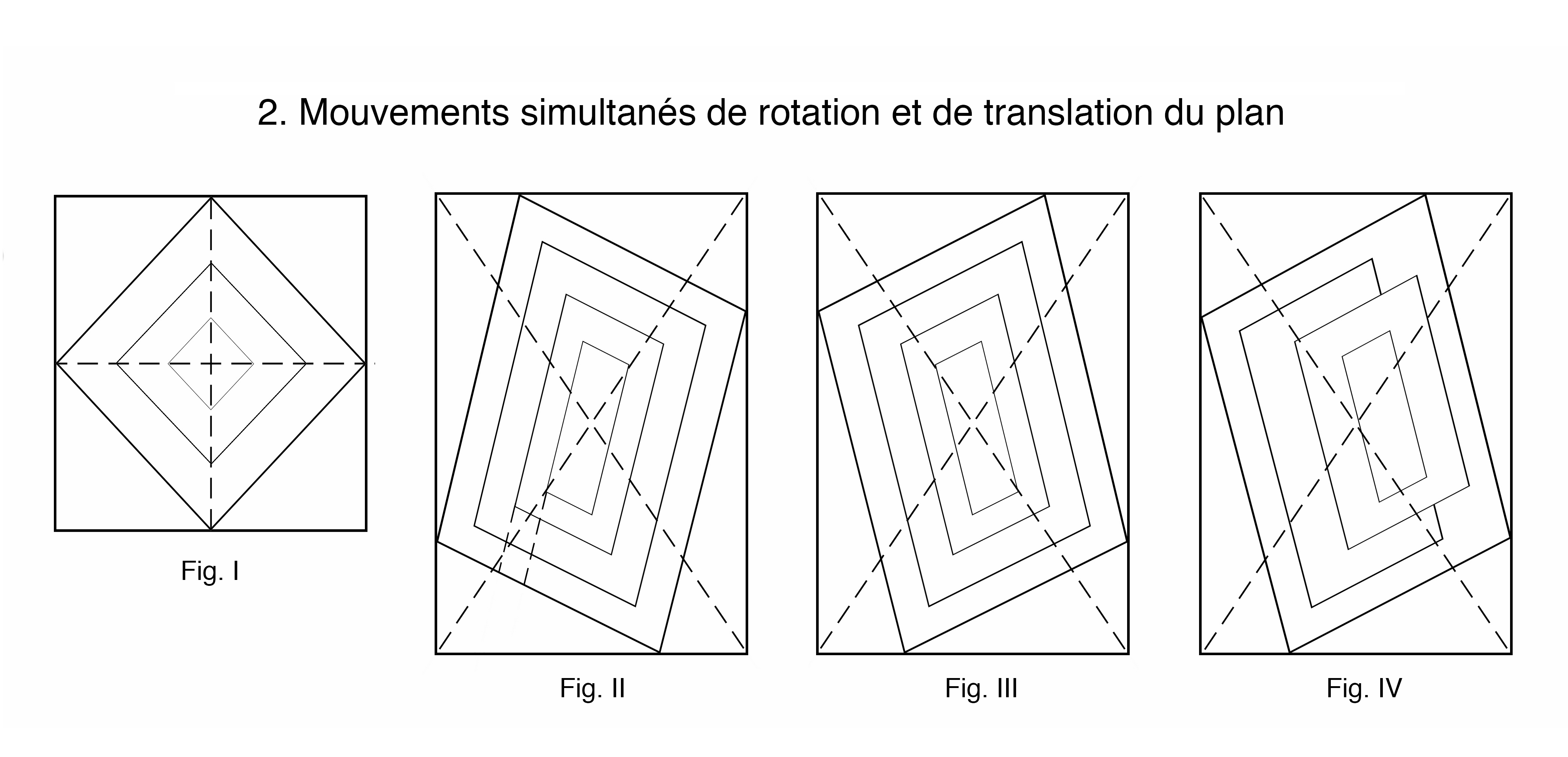
2. Simultaneous movements of rotation and translation of the plane

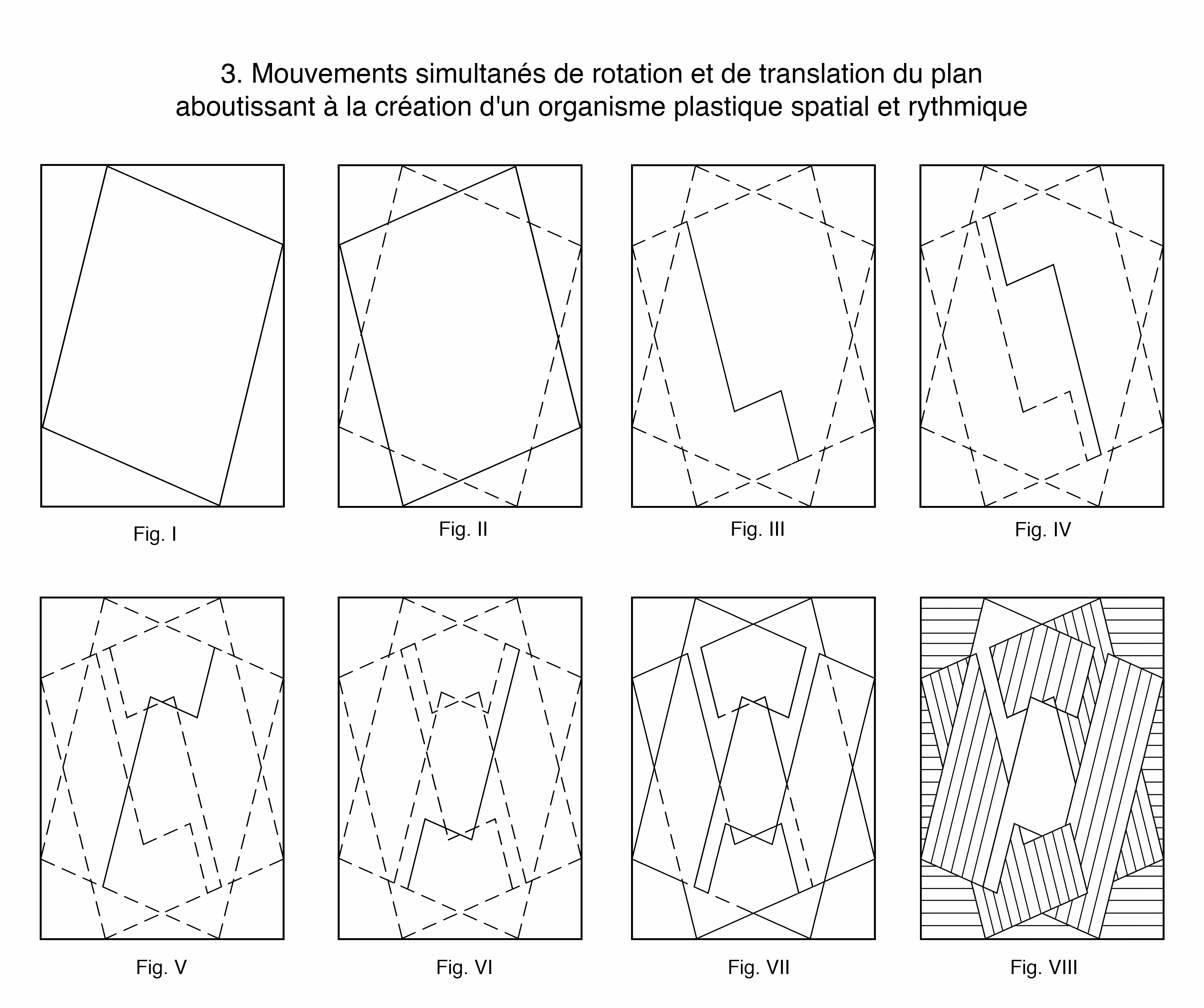
3. Simultaneous movements of rotation and translation of the plane resulting in the creation of a spatial and rhythmic plastic organism

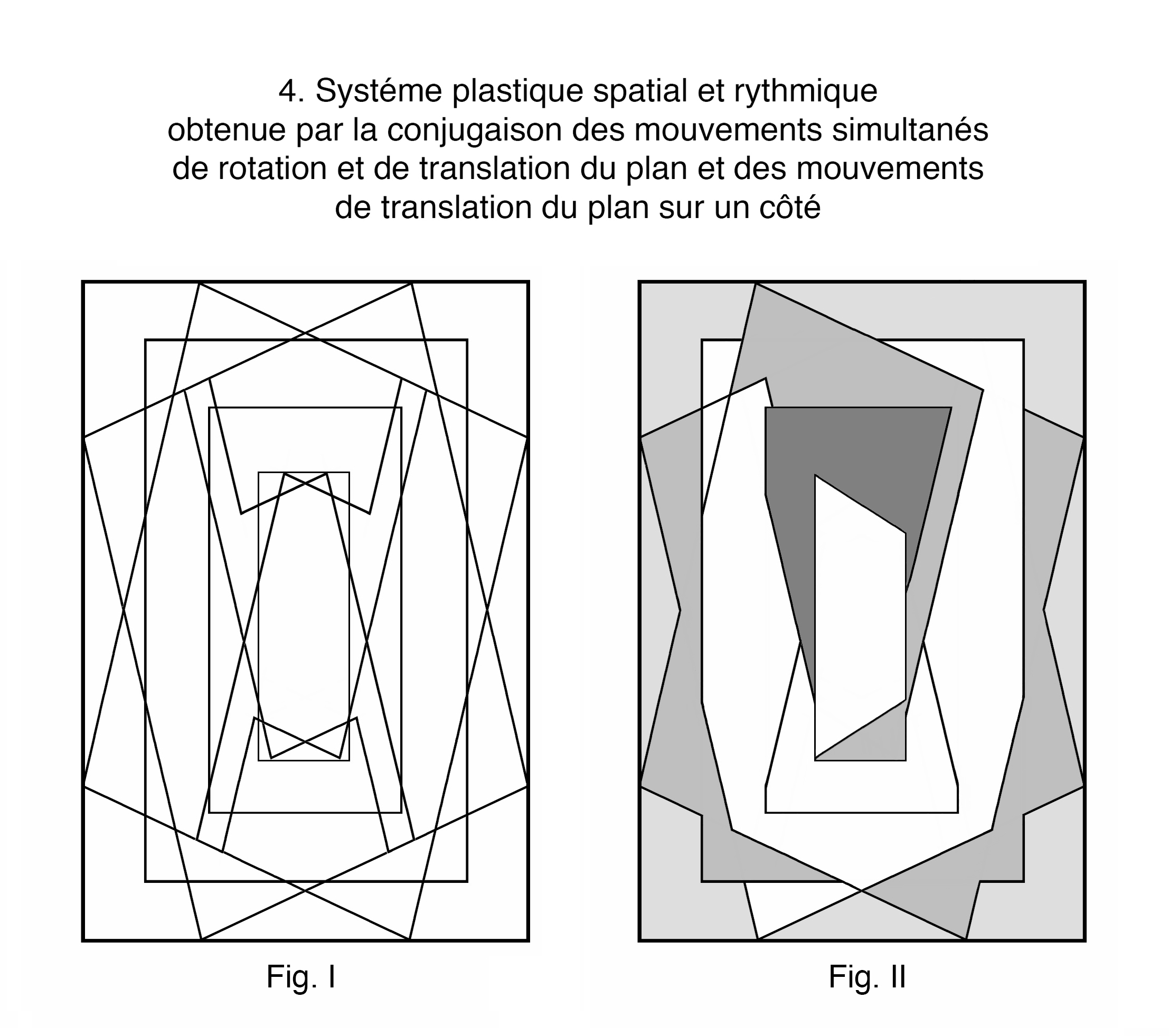
4. Plastic spatial and rhythmic system obtained by the conjugation of simultaneous movements of rotation and translation of the plane and from the movements of translation of the plane to one side

== Published writings ==
=== Books ===
- Du "Cubisme", Albert Gleizes and Jean Metzinger, Paris, Figuière, 1912 (published in English and Russian in 1913, a new edition was published in 1947)
- Du Cubisme et des moyens de le comprendre, Paris, La Cible, Povolozky, 1920 (published in German in 1922).
- La Mission créatrice de l’Homme dans le domaine plastique, Paris, La Cible, Povolozky, 1921 (published in Polish in 1927).
- La Peinture et ses lois, ce qui devait sortir du Cubisme, Paris, 1924 (published in English in 2000)
- Tradition et Cubisme. Vers une conscience plastique. Articles et Conférences 1912–1924, Paris, La Cible, Povolozky, 1927
- Peinture et Perspective descriptive, conference at the Carnegie Foundation for l’Union Intellectuelle française, Paris, 22 March 1927. Sablons, Moly-Sabata, 1927
- Kubismus, Bauhausbücher 13, Munich, Albert Langen Verlag, 1928 (re-edited by Florian Kupferberg Verlag in 1980).
- Vie et Mort de l’Occident Chrétien, Sablons, Moly-Sabata, 1930 (published in English in 1947)
- Vers une Conscience plastique : La Forme et l’Histoire, Paris, Povolozky, 1932
- Art et Science, Sablons, Moly-Sabata, 1933. 2ème édition, Aix-en-Provence, 1961. Conference at Lodz, Poland, 28 April 1932, and Stuttgart, 6 Mai 1932.
- Homocentrisme; Le retour de l’Homme chrétien; Le Rythme dans les Arts plastiques, Sablons, Moly-Sabata, 1937
- La Signification Humaine du Cubisme, Lecture by Albert Gleizes at the Petit Palais, Paris, 18 July 1938, Sablons, Moly-Sabata, 1938
- Du Cubisme, Albert Gleizes and Jean Metzinger, Paris, Compagnie Française des Arts Graphiques, 1947 (re-edition of the 1912 book with slight modifications and a new Preface by Albert Gleizes).
- Souvenirs, le Cubisme 1908–1914, Lyon, Cahiers Albert Gleizes, L’Association des Amis d’Albert Gleizes, 1957
- Puissances du Cubisme, Chambéry, éditions Présence, 1969. Collection of articles published between 1925 and 1946
- Art et religion, Art et science, Art et production, Chambéry, éditions Présence, 1970 (published in English in 2000)
- L'Homme devenu peintre, Paris, Fondation Albert Gleizes and Somogy éditions d'Art, 1998

=== Articles ===
- L'Art et ses représentants. Jean Metzinger, Revue Indépendante, Paris, September 1911, pp. 161–172
- Le Fauconnier et son oeuvre, Revue Indépendante, Paris, October 1911 Unlocated article listed in Le Fauconnier bibliographies
- Les Beaux Arts. A propos du Salon d'Automne, Les Bandeaux d'Or, séries 4, no. 13, 1911–1912, pp. 42–51
- "Cubisme devant les Artistes", Les Annates politiques et littéraires, Paris, December 1912, pp. 473–475. A response to an inquiry
- Le Cubisme et la Tradition, Montjoie, Paris, 10 February 1913, p. 4. Reprinted in Tradition et Cubisme, Paris, 1927
- [Extracts from O Kubisme], Soyuz Molodezhi, Sbornik, St. Petersburg, no. 3, 1913. With commentary. Reference from gray, Camilla. The Great Experiment: Russian Art, 1893–1922, New York, Abrams, 1962, p. 308
- Opinions (Mes Tableaux), Montjoie, Paris, nos. 11–12, November–December 1913, p. 14
- C’est en allant se jeter à la mer que le fleuve reste fidèle à sa source, Le Mot, Paris, vol. I, no. 17, 1 Mai 1915
- French Artists Spur on American Art, New York Herald, 24 October 1915, pp. 2–3. An interview
- Interview with Gleizes (Duchamp, Picabia and Crotti), The Literary Digest, New York, 27 November 1915, pp. 1224–1225
- "La Peinture Moderne", 391, New York, no. 5, June 1917, pp. 6–7
- The Abbey of Créteil, A Communistic Experiment, The Modern School, Stelton, New Jersey, October 1918. Edited by Carl Zigrosser
- The Impersonality of American Art, Playboy, New York, nos. 4 and 5, 1919, pp. 25–26. Translated by Stephen Bourgeois. Preface to an exhibition of modern art at the Bourgeois Galleries, New York, 1919
- "Vers une epoque de batisseurs", Clarte (Bulletin Français), Paris, 1920, no. 13, 14, 15, 32
- Letter to Herwarth Walden, 30 April 1920, Der Sturm, Berlin, Nationalgalerie, September, 1961, p. 46
- L’Affaire dada. Action, Paris, no. 3, April 1920, pp. 26–32. Re-printed in English in Motherwell, Robert, ed. Dada Painters and Poets, New York, 1951, pp. 298–302
- Dieu Nouveau, La Vie des Lettres, Paris, October 1920, p. 178
- Réhabilitation des Arts Plastiques, La Vie des Lettres et des Arts, Paris, series 2, no. 4, April 1921, pp. 411–122. Reprinted in Tradition et Cubisme, Paris, 1927
- L'Etat du Cubisme aujourd'hui, La Vie des Lettres et des Arts, Paris, series 2, no. 15, 1922, pp. 13–17
- Tradition und Freiheit, Das Kunstblatt, Berlin, vol. 6, no. 1, 1922, pp. 26–32
- Ein Neuer Naturalismus? Eine Rundfrage des Kunstblatts, Das Kunstblatt, Berlin, vol. 6, no. 9, 1922, pp. 387–389. Reply to an inquiry
- "Perle", La Bataille Littéraire, Brussels, vol. 4, no. 2, 25 February 1922, pp. 35–36 [A poem, New York, 1916]
- La Peinture et ses Lois : Ce qui devait sortir du Cubisme, La Vie des Lettres et des Arts, Paris, series 2, no. 12, March 1923, pp. 26–73
- Jean Lurcat, Das Kunstblatt, vol. 7, no. 8, 1923, pp. 225–228
- L’Art moderne et la Société nouvelle, Moniteur de l’Académie Socialiste, Moscou, 1923. Reprinted in Tradition et Cubisme, Paris, 1927, pp. 149–161
- Où va la peinture moderne? Bulletin de l’Effort Moderne, Paris, no. 5, May 1924, p. 14. Response to an inquiry
- La Renaissance et la peinture d'aujourd'hui, La Vie des Lettres et des Arts, Paris, décembre 1924 (repris dans Tradition et Cubisme, Paris, 1927, p. 179–191)
- La Peinture et ses Lois, Bulletin de l’Effort Moderne, Paris, no. 5, May 1924, p. 4–9, no. 13, March 1925, p. 1–4
- A propos de la Section d'Or de 1912, Les Arts Plastiques, Paris, no. 1, January,1925, pp. 5–7
- Chez les Cubistes: une enquête, Bulletin de la Vie Artistique, Paris, vol. 6, no. 1, January 1925, pp. 15–19. Response to an inquiry
- L’inquiétude, Crise plastique, La Vie des Lettres et des Arts, Paris, series 2, no. 20, May 1925, pp. 38–52
- A l'Exposition, que pensez-vous du... Pavilion de Russie, Bulletin de la Vie Artistique, vol. 6, no. 11, 1 June 1925, pp. 235–237. Response to an inquiry
- "Cubisme", La Vie des Lettres et des Arts, Paris, series 2, no. 21, 1926, pp. 51–65. Announced as French text of Kubismus, Bauhausbücher 13, Munich, 1928, written in September 1925, at Serrieres
- Cubisme (Vers une conscience plastique). Bulletin de l'Effort Moderne, Paris, no. 22, February 1926; no. 23, March 1926; no. 24, April 1926; no. 25, May, 1926; no. 26, June 1926; no. 27, July 1926; no. 28, October 1926; no. 29, November 1926; no. 30, December 1926; no. 31, January 1927; no. 32, February 1927. Extracts, announced as partial contents of Kubismus, Bauhausbücher 13, 1928
- L’Epopée. De la Forme immobile à la Forme mobile, Le Rouge et le Noir, Paris, October 1929, pp. 57–99. The final French text of Kubismus, Bauhausbücher 13, Munich, Albert Langen Verlag, 1928 (re-edited by Florian Kupferberg Verlag in 1980).
- Charles Henry et le Vitalisme, Cahiers de l'Etoile, Paris, no. 13, January–February 1930, pp. 112–128. [Preface to La Forme et l'Histoire], l'Alliance Universelle, Paris, 30 April 1930
- Les Attitudes Fondamentales de l'Esprit Moderne, Bulletin de la VIIème Congrès de la Fédération Internationale des Unions Intellectuelles, Kraków, October 1930. [Preface to an Exhibition of Paintings by Gottfried Graf, Berlin, 1931]. Quoted in Chevalier, Le Dénouement traditionnel du Cubisme, 2, Confluences, Lyon, no. 8, February 1942, p. 193
- Civilization et Propositions, La Semaine Egyptienne, Alexandria, 31 October 1932, p. 5
- Moly-Sabata ou le Retour des Artistes au Village, Sud Magazine, Marseilles, no. 1021, 1 June 1932. [Statement], Abstraction-Creation, Art Non-Figuratif, Paris, no. 1, 1932, pp. 15–16
- La Grande Ville et Ses Signes, La Liberté, Paris, 7 May 1933, p. 2
- Vers la régénération intellectuelle, Naturisme du corps: naturisme de l'esprit, Régénération, Paris, new series, no. 46, July–August 1933, pp. 117–119. [Statement], Abstraction-Creation, Art Non-Figuratif, Paris, no. 2, 1933, p. 18
- Vers une conscience plastique, La Forme et l'Histoire, Sud, magazine méditerranéen, no. 104, 1–16 July 1933, p. 20–21
- Propos de peintre, Almanach vivarois 1933, Sous le signe de July 1933, p. 30–34. May 2007
- Le Retour de l’Homme à sa Vie, Jeunesse, and Jeunesse (suite), Régénération, Paris, no. 49, 50, 53, 1934. [Expose] Abstraction-Création, Art Non Figuratif, Paris, no. 3, 1934, p. 18
- Agriculture et Machinisme, Regeneration, Paris, no. 53, August–September 1934, pp. 11–14. Enlarged version of article originally published in Lyon Republicain, 1 January 1932
- Le Groupe de l'Abbaye. La Nouvelle Abbaye de Moly-Sabata, Cahiers Américains, Paris, New York, no. 6, Winter, 1934, pp. 253–259
- Le Retour à la Terre, Beaux-Arts, Paris, 14 December 1934, p. 2
- Peinture et Peinture, Sud Magazine, Marseilles, no. 8, August 1935. Offprint. (In Puissances du Cubisme, 1969, pp. 185–199)
- Retour à l’Homme. Mais à quel Homme?, December 1935. Offprint, Sud Magazine, Marseilles. (In Puissances du Cubisme, 1969, pp. 201–218)
- Arabesques, Cahiers du Sud, (special edition), L’Islam et l’Occident, vol. 22, no. 175, August–September, 1935, pp. 101–106. (In Puissances du Cubisme, 1969, pp. 169–175)
- Article dated Serrieres d'Ardeche, November, 1934. [Statement], Abstraction-Creation, Art Non-Figuratif, Paris, no. 5, 1936, pp. 7–8
- La Question de Métier, Beaux-Arts, Paris, 9 October 1936, p. 1
- Art Régional, Tous les Arts à Paris, Paris, 15 December 1936
- Le Problème de la Lumière, Cahiers du Sud, vol. 24, no. 192, March 1937, pp. 190–207. (From d'Homocentrisme, also in Puissance du cubisme, 1969, pp. 245–267)
- Cubisme et Surréalisme: Deux Tentatives Pour Redécouvrir l'Homme, Deuxiéme Congrés international d'esthétique et de science de l'art, Paris, 1937, II p. 337. (In Puissances du cubisme, 1969, p. 269–282)
- Tradition et Modernisme, l'Art et les Artistes, Paris, no. 37, January 1939, pp. 109–115
- L'Oeuvre de Maurice Garnier, Sud Magazine, Marseille, mars-avril 1939, p. 15–17
- Artistes et Artisans, L’Opinion, Cannes, 31 May 1941
- Spiritualité, Rythme, Forme, Confluences: Les Problèmes de la Peinture, Lyon, 1945, section 6. Special edition, edited by Gaston Diehl. (In Puissance du cubisme, 1969, p. 315–344)
- Apollinaire, la Justice et Moi, Guillaume Apollinaire, Souvenirs et Témoignages, Paris, Editions de la Tête Noire, 1946, pp. 53–65. Edited by Marcel Adema
- L’Arc en Ciel, clé de l’Art chrétien médiéval, Les Etudes Philosophiques, new series, no. 2, April–June 1946. [Statement], Realites Nouvelles, Paris, no. 1, 1947, pp. 34–35 (In Puissances du cubisme, 1969, p. 345–357)
- Réalités Nouvelles, Paris, no. 1, 1947, p. 34–35. Préliminaires à une étude sur les variations iconographiques de la Croix, Témoignages, Cahiers de la Pierre-qui-Vire, no. 15, October 1947
- Life and Death of the Christian West, Londres, Dennis Dobson Ltd., 1947. Preface by H. J. Massingham, translation by Aristide Messinesi
- Y a-t-il un Art Traditionnel Chrétien ?, Témoignages, Cahiers de la Pierre-qui-Vire, July 1948
- L’Art Sacré est Théologique et Symbolique, Arts, Paris, no. 148, 9 January 1948, p. 8
- Active Tradition of the East and West, Art and Thought, Londres, February 1948, p. 244–251 (Ananda K. Coomaraswamy, homage)
- Pourquoi j'illustre Les Pensées de Pascal, Arts, 24 March 1950, p. 1–2
- Introduction au catalogue de l'exposition Les Pensées de Pascal, Chapelle de l’Oratoire, Avignon, 22 July – 31 August 1950
- Peinture d’Opinion et Peinture de Métier, L’Atelier de la Rose, Lyon, June 1951
- Réflexions sur l’Art dit Abstrait et du Caractère de l’Image dans la Non-Figuration, I, L’Atelier de la Rose, Lyon, October 1951
- Réflexions sur l’Art dit Abstrait et du Caractère de l’Image dans la Non-Figuration, II, L’Atelier de la Rose, Lyon, January 1952
- L’Esprit fondamental de l’Art roman, L’Atelier de la Rose, Lyon, September 1952
- Mentalité Renouvelée, I, L’Atelier de la Rose, Lyon, December 1952
- Présence d’Albert Gleizes, Zodiaque, Saint-Léger-Vauban, no. 6–7, January 1952
- L’Esprit de ma fresque : L’Eucharistie, L’Atelier de la Rose, Lyon, March 1953.
- Mentalité Renouvelée, Il, L’Atelier de la Rose, Lyon, June 1953, pp. 452–460.
- Conformisme, Réforme et Révolution, Correspondences, Tunis, no. 2, 1954, p. 39–45. (With a biographical note by Jean Cathelin)
- Un potier [sur Anne Dangar ], La belle Journée est passée, Zodiaque, Saint-Léger-Vauban, no. 25, April 1955.
- Caractères de l’Art Celtique, Actualité de l’Art Celtique, Cahiers d’Histoire et de Folklore, Lyon, 1956, pp. 55–97 (extraits de La Forme et l’Histoire, 1932)
- Souvenirs, le Cubisme 1908–1914, Lyon, Cahiers Albert Gleizes, L’Association des Amis d’Albert Gleizes, 1957 (from Souvenirs, manuscript conserved at the Kandinsky Library / Centre Pompidou, Paris)
- Introduction à Mainie Jellett, The Artists’ Vision, Dundalk, Dundalgan Press, 1958, pp. 25–45 (written in 1948)
- Puissances du Cubisme, Chambéry, éditions Présence, 1969 (articles published between 1925 and 1946)
- Art et religion, Art et science, Art et production, Chambéry, éditions Présence, 1970. (English edition by Peter Brooke, 1999)
- Fragments de notes inédites (1946), Zodiaque, n° 100, April 1974, pp. 39–74
- Du Cubisme, Jean Metzinger, Aubard (éditions Présence), 1980 (re-edition of the 1947 version with an introduction by Daniel Robbins)
- Albert Gleizes en 1934, Ampuis, Association des Amis d'Albert Gleizes, 1991. (from Souvenirs, manuscript conserved at the Kandinsky Library / Centre Pompidou, Paris)
- Sujet et objet, deux lettres adressées à André Lhote, Ampuis, Association des Amis d’Albert Gleizes, 1996
