= Woman with Black Glove =

Painting by Albert Gleizes

- Femme au gant noir (French)
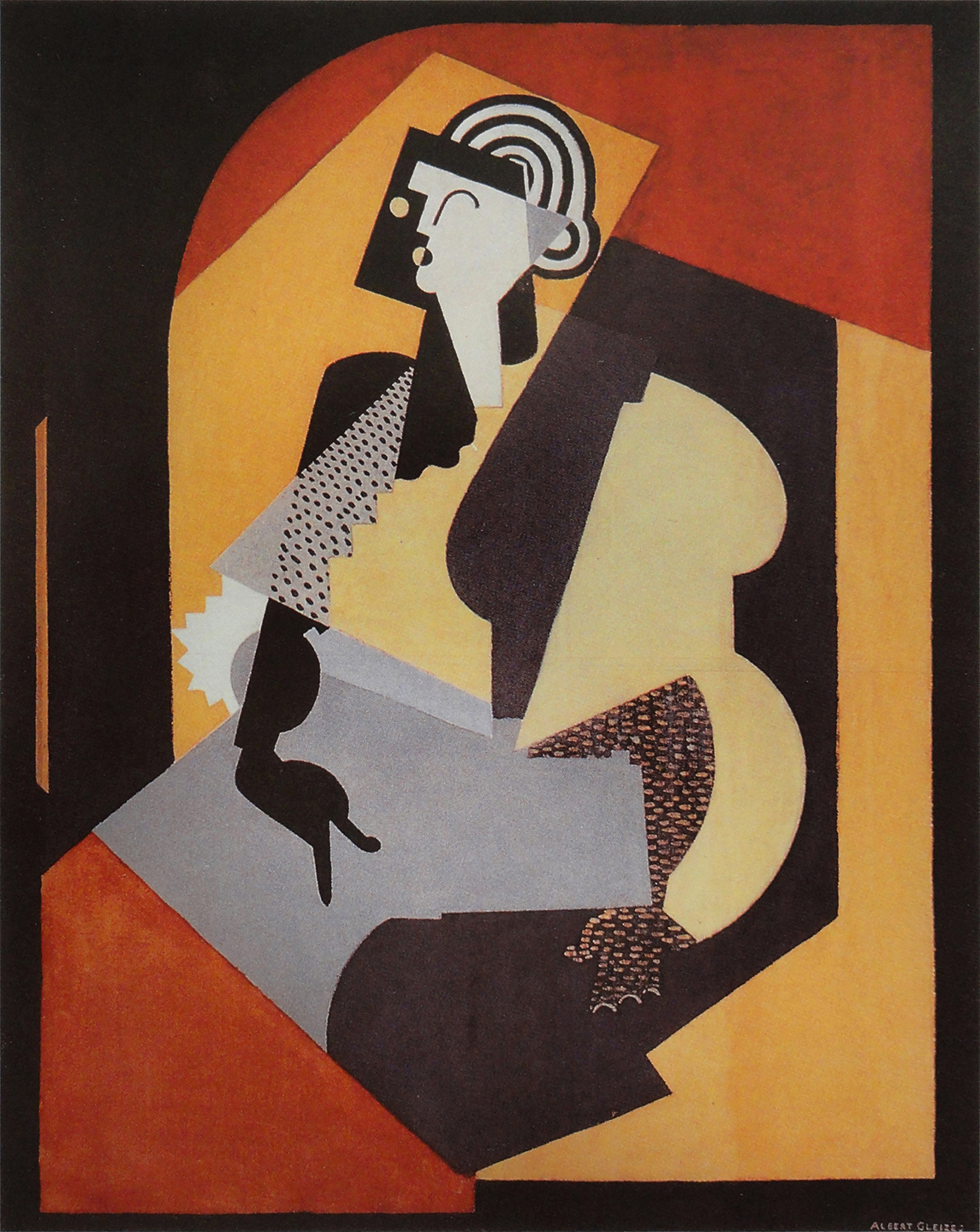
- Artist: Albert Gleizes
- Year: 1920
- Medium: Oil on canvas
- Dimensions: 126 cm × 100 cm (49.6 in × 39.37 in)
- Location: National Gallery of Australia; Canberra

Woman with Black Glove (French: Femme au gant noir, or Femme Assise) is a painting by the French artist, theorist and writer Albert Gleizes. Painted in 1920, after returning to Paris in the wake of World War I, the paintings highly abstract structure is consistent with style of experimentation that transpired during the second synthetic phase of Cubism, called Crystal Cubism. As other post-wartime works by Gleizes, Woman with Black Glove represents a break from the first phase of Cubism, with emphasis placed on flat surface activity and large overlapping geometric planes.

There are several smaller versions of Woman with Black Glove, illustrating a facet of Gleizes' pursuits during the early 1920s: "reminiscences of specific reality evoked within the context of increasingly careful picture construction", writes art historian Daniel Robbins.

Woman with Black Glove was exhibited at the Salon d'Automne, Grand Palais, Paris, 15 October – 12 December 1920. The work was reproduced in Floréal: l'hebdomadaire illustré du monde du travail, no. 45, 11 December 1920 (titled Peinture avec femme assise).

Formerly in the private collection of Juliette Roche-Gleizes (wife of the artist), Woman with Black Glove is located at the National Gallery of Australia.

== Description ==
Woman with Black Glove is an oil painting on canvas with dimensions 126 x 100 cm (49.6 x 39.37 inches), signed Albert Gleizes, lower right, and dated 1.1.1920. As indicated by the title, the work represents a woman wearing a glove. She is seated on an angle facing toward left with respect to the viewer. Her face and head are composed of simple geometric shapes (circles, arcs, rectangles or squares) that delineate the woman's eyes, nose and mouth. Her hair, coiffed in chignon hairstyle, is treated in a series of concentric circles. Her clothed body is constructed with seemingly arbitrary forms, and is place within a background composition of highly geometric interconnected planes or surfaces. An arch toward the upper left is reminiscent of a doorway or window, but there is no indication whether the scene is an interior or exterior representation.

The overall color scheme is warm, consisting of red through yellow, browns and tans (earth tones, ochres), and black, along with varying shades of cool gray. The artists use of bold contrasts between light and dark affect the entire composition. However, there is a striking absence of chiaroscuro modeling that would otherwise indicate a sense of volume in modeling the three-dimensional figure, or give a sense of the direction of light cast upon the model. The overt distillation of the composition, with its emphasis placed on flat surface activity, large overlapping planes, and the primacy of the underlying geometric structure rooted in the abstract, is consistent with Crystal Cubism.

== Background ==
In an article on the topic of the 1920 Salon d'Automne exhibition, published in Floréal (hebdomadaire), 1920, the art critic Castaing writes of Gleizes' entry, Femme au gant noir:

Gleizes has sent a very pure portrait of a woman. He is a researcher and this is intelligence. We feel in him something new and strong. His painting for the great halls of future cities project a flamboyance of colors to which we were not accustom [Gleizes a envoyé un portrait de femme très pur. C'est un chercheur et c'est une intelligence. On sent en lui quelque chose de neuf et de fort. Sa peinture pour les grands halls des cités futures dégage un flamboiement de couleurs auquel il ne nous avait pas habitués].

Gleizes's works from this period are "characterized by dynamic intersections of vertical, diagonal, horizontal and circular movements", writes Robbins, "austere in touch but loaded with energetic pattern." This unity, and the highly crystalline geometricized materialization consisting of superimposed constituent planes, ultimately referred to by the French poet and art critic Maurice Raynal as Crystal Cubism, would soon be described by Gleizes in La Peinture et ses lois (1922–23), as 'simultaneous movements of translation and rotation of the plane'. The synthetic factor was taken furthest of all from within the Cubists by Gleizes.

Basing himself on his 1915 abstractions, Gleizes sought to clarify his intentions and methods further still in La Peinture et ses lois, deducing the fundamental principles of painting from the picture plane, its proportions, the movement of the human eye and the universal physical laws. These theoretical postulates, later referred to as translation-rotation, according to Robbins, rank "with the writings of Mondrian and Malevich as one of the most thorough expositions of the principles of abstract art. The case of Woman with Black Glove, however, entails the acceptance of both representation and geometric forms.

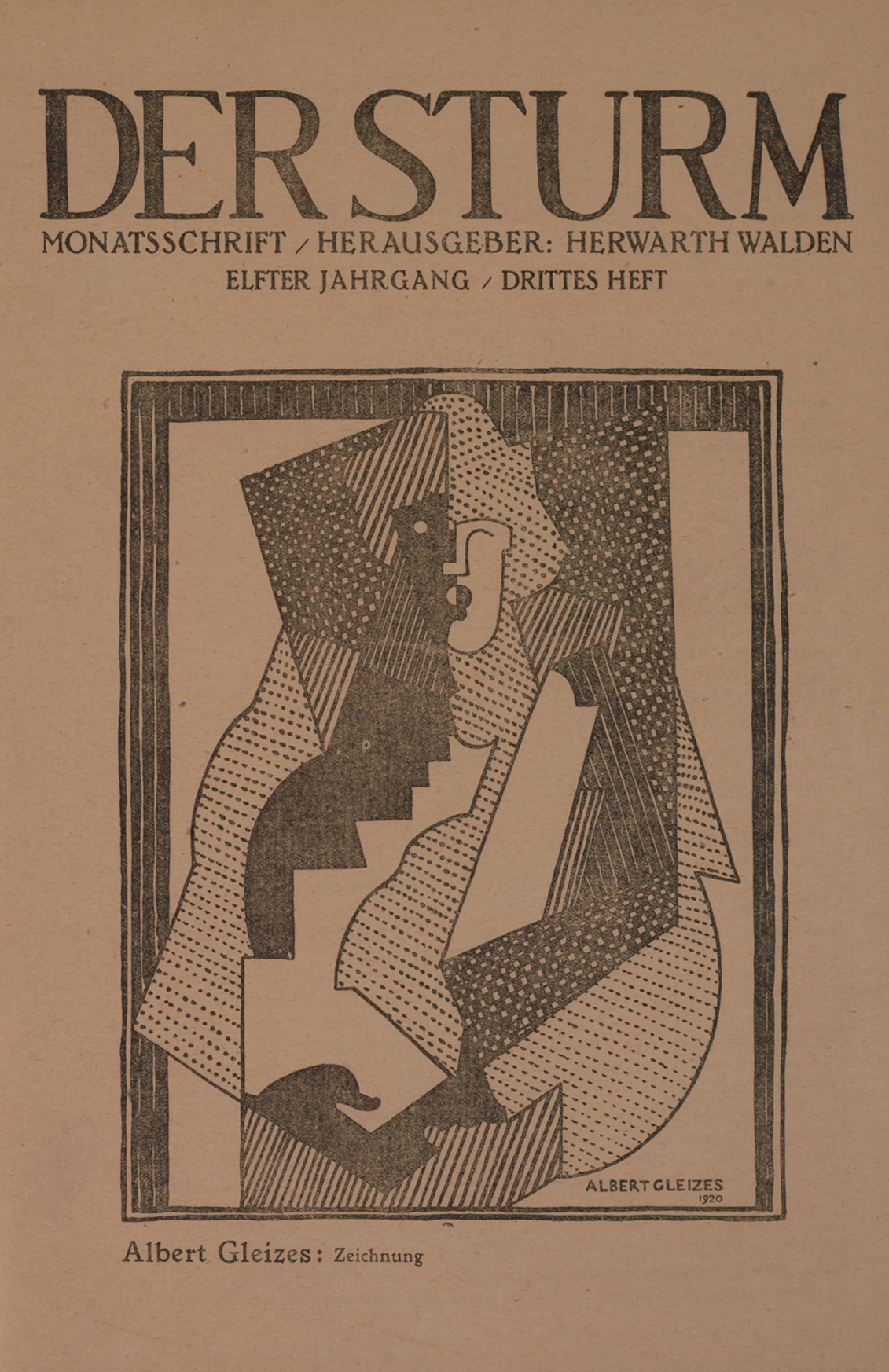
Albert Gleizes, study for Femme au gants noirs, drawing (zeichnung), published on the cover of Der Sturm, 5 June 1920

Following the First World War, Gleizes deliberately purged his art of visible brushstrokes, of the artists physical gesture, which amounted to what he called a "aesthetic trick". Instead, his attention became focused on the associations between various geometric structures. The attempt was to arrive at a fundamental unity of the picture plane, through the deployment of highly crystalline geometricized superimpositions of constituent surfaces, described by Gleizes, in La Peinture et ses lois as 'simultaneous movements of translation and rotation of the plane'.

The problem set out by Gleizes was to replace anecdote as a starting point for the work of art, by the sole means of using the elements of the painting itself: line, form and color. Beginning with an elementary form such as a central rectangle, Gleizes mechanically juxtaposed forms to create a painting: (1) either by reproducing the initial form (employing various symmetries such as reflectional, rotational or translational), or by modifying (or not) its dimensions. (2) By displacement of the initial form; pivoting around an imaginary axis in one direction or another.

The choice of position (through translation and/or rotation), though based on the inspiration of the artist, is no longer attributed to the anecdotal. An objective and rigorous method, independent of the painter, replaces emotion or sensibility in the determination the placement of form, that is, through translation and rotation.

According to Gleizes, 'translation' represented an unfolding of planes as seen against the surface of a painting (a square or rectangular); 'rotation' occurred when these planes began to shift around a central point.

In La peinture ou de l’homme devenu peintre, Gleizes writes:

Painting by its nature is not a spectacle, nor an object seen via a point of perspective, it is instead its own object. There are three types of expression in objective painting: there is the pure work, without recourse to recollected or written history. There is the work which freely experiences recalled imagery by coincidental interrelation of melodic lines. Finally there is the work where an iconographic subject has been freely undertaken.

Already in 1920, Gleizes had published his views on this new technique of painting in Du Cubisme et les moyens de le comprendre, in which he insists that the 2-dimensional planar surface, with clearly defined limits, is the primary reality in painting, and that the artist should work with it, as opposed to against it. He argues that Cubism had been a search for a precise scientific method to replace the old scientific method of one-point perspective, and that the essential elements of this new method are now known.

== Related works ==
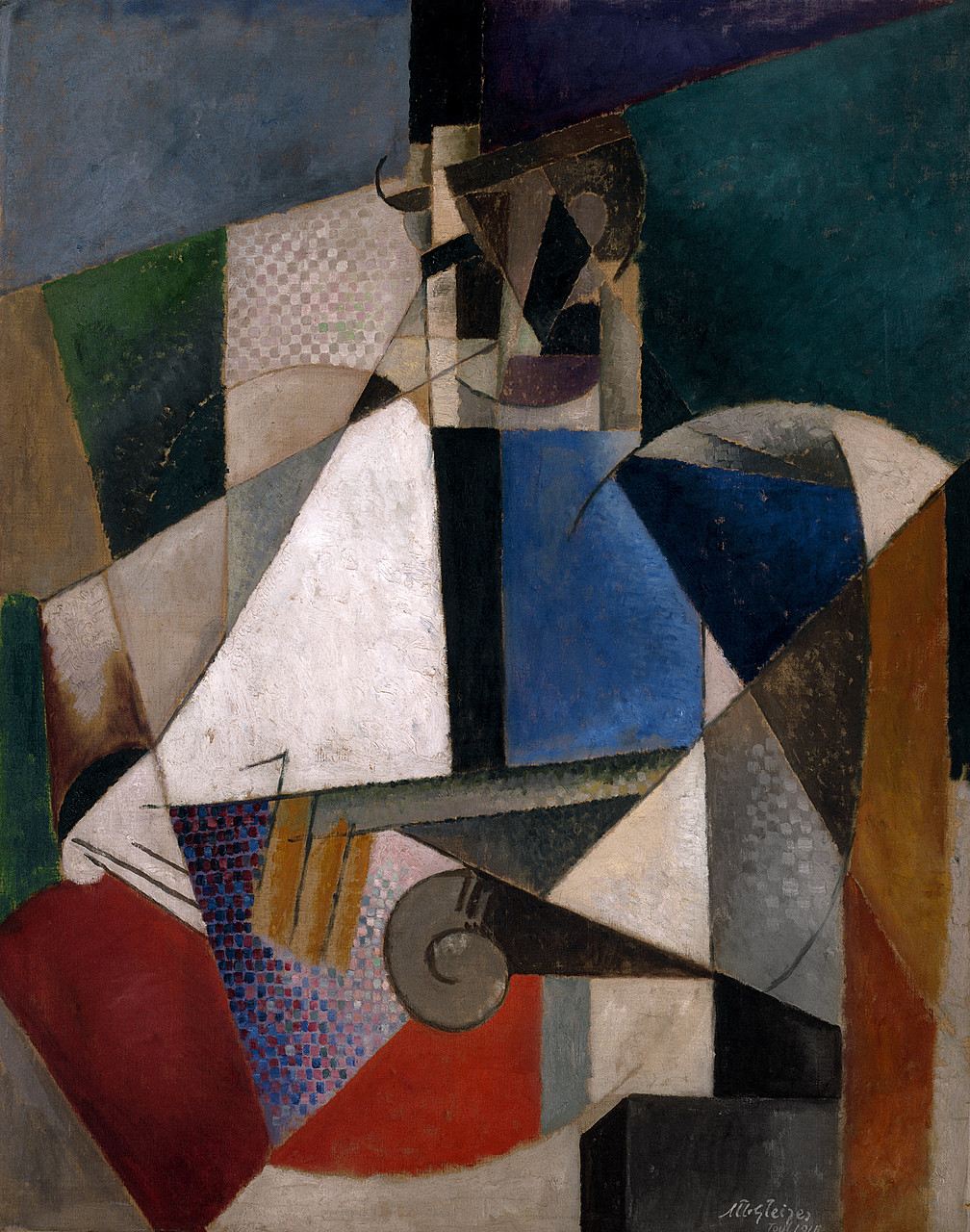
Albert Gleizes, 1914–15, Portrait of an Army Doctor (Portrait d'un médecin militaire), oil on canvas, 119.8 x 95.1 cm, Solomon R. Guggenheim Museum

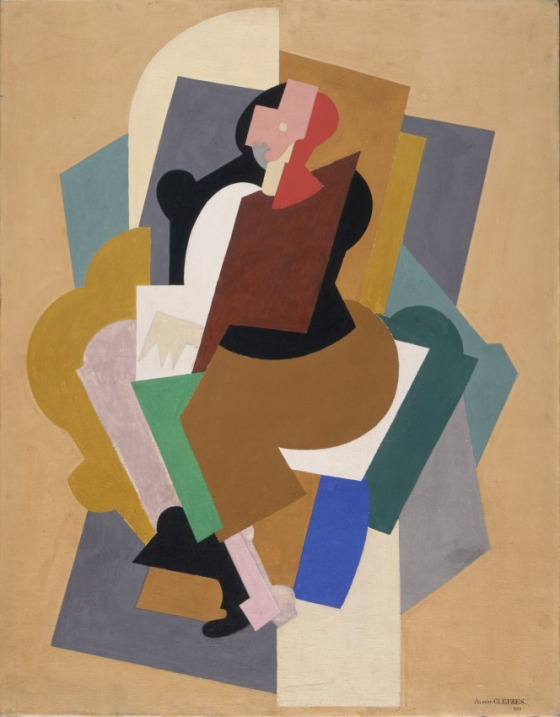
Albert Gleizes, 1920, Figure, gouache on canvas, 91.4 x 76.2 cm, Los Angeles County Museum of Art

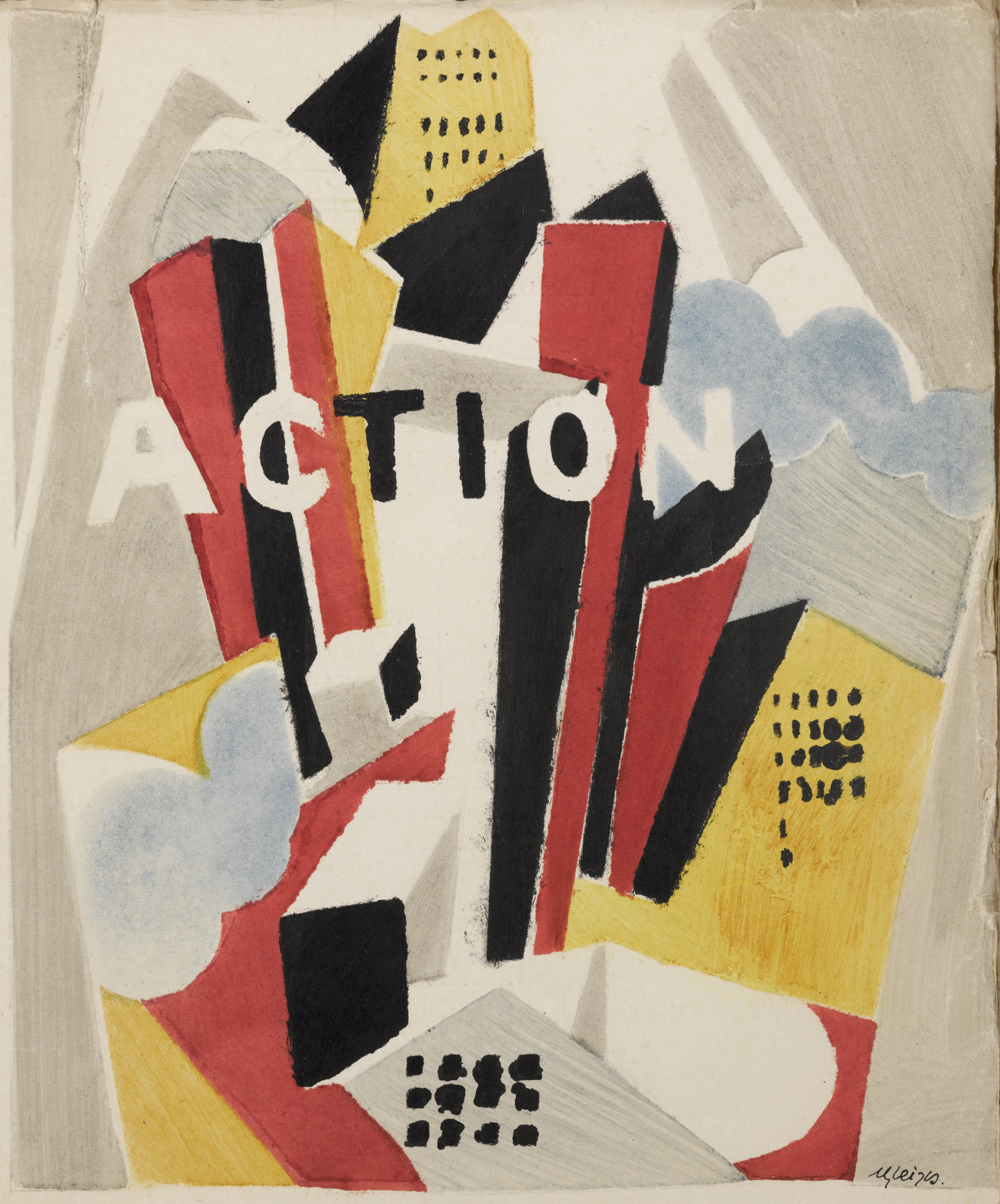
Albert Gleizes, Action, Cahiers Individualistes de philosophie et d'art, Volume 1, No. 1, February 1920

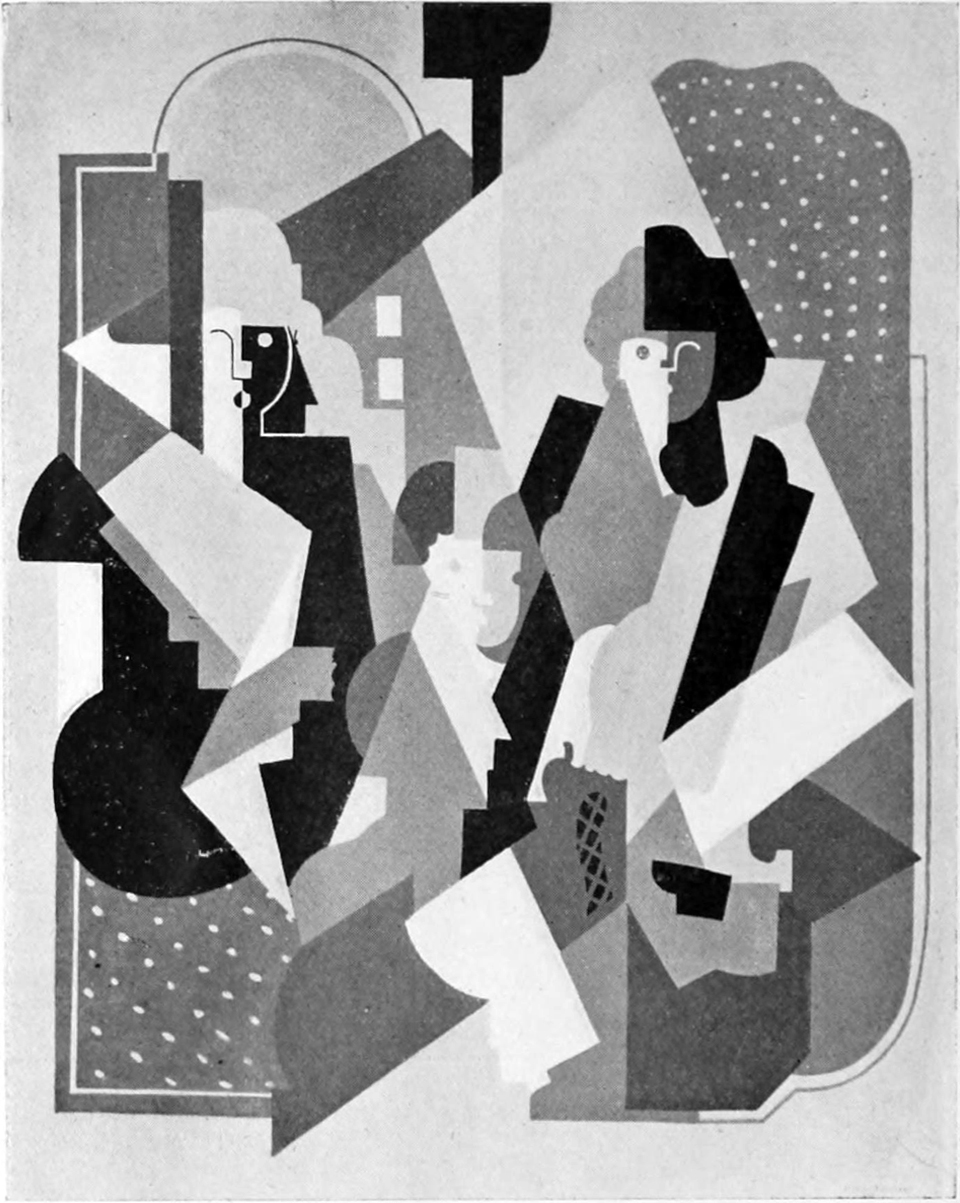
Albert Gleizes, c.1920, Figures planes (Trois personnages assis), dimensions approximately 126 x 100 cm, location unknown. Exhibited Der Sturm, Berlin, 1921 (no. 927) and reproduced in Gleizes 1927, p. 97.

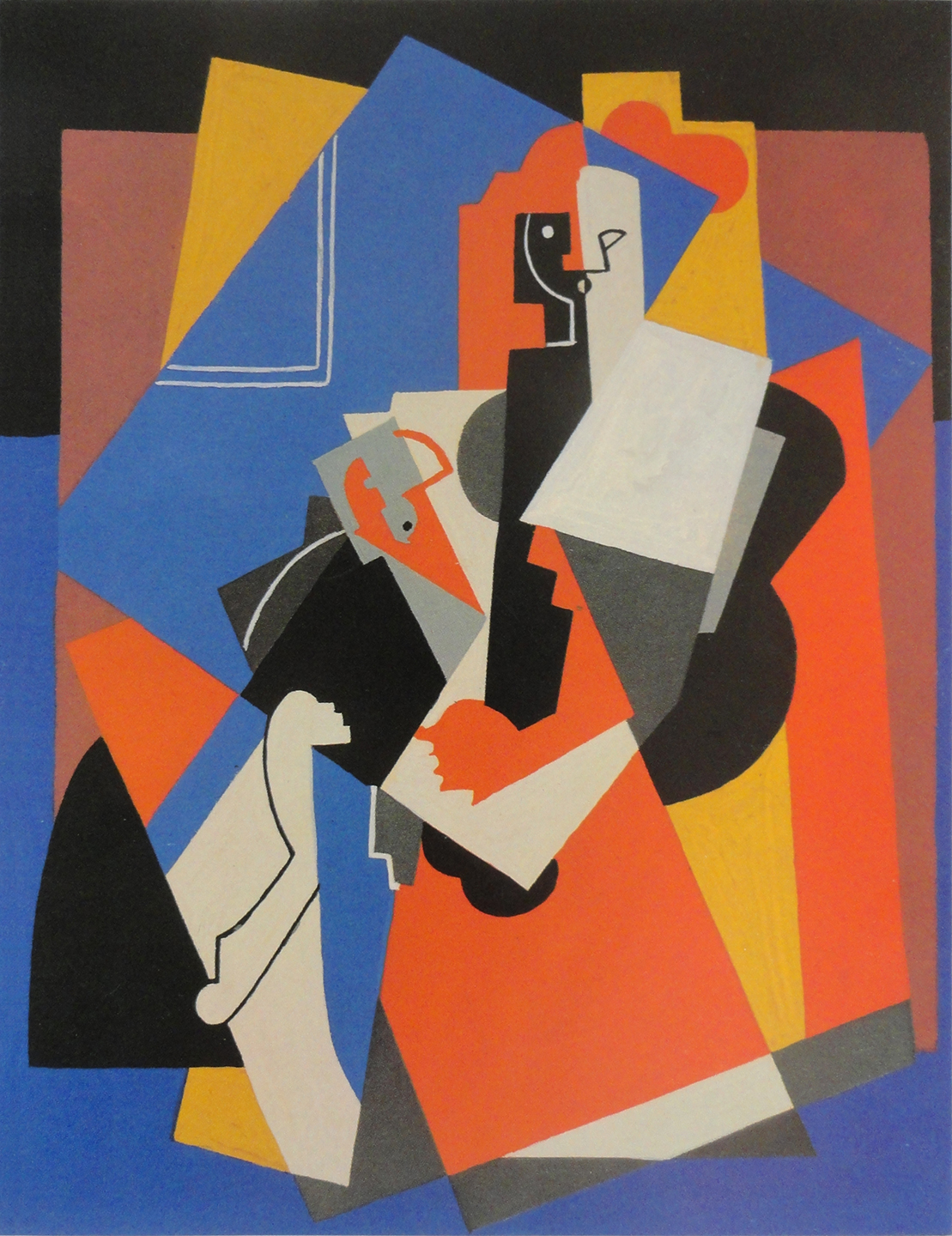
Albert Gleizes, 1920, Femme et enfant (Woman and child), reproduced in Der Sturm, 5 October 1921

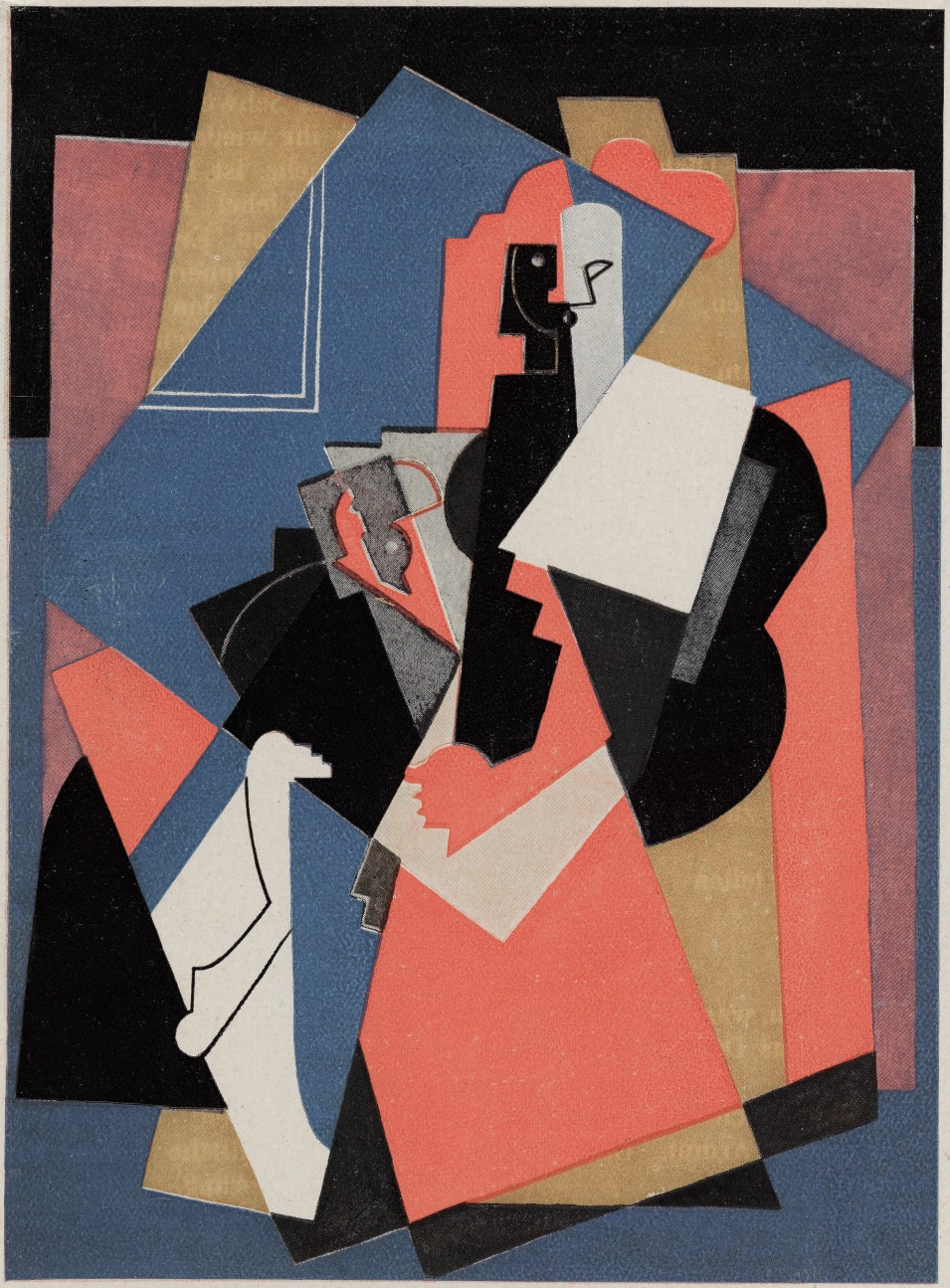
Albert Gleizes, Woman and child (Frau und Kind), Der Sturm, 5 October 1921

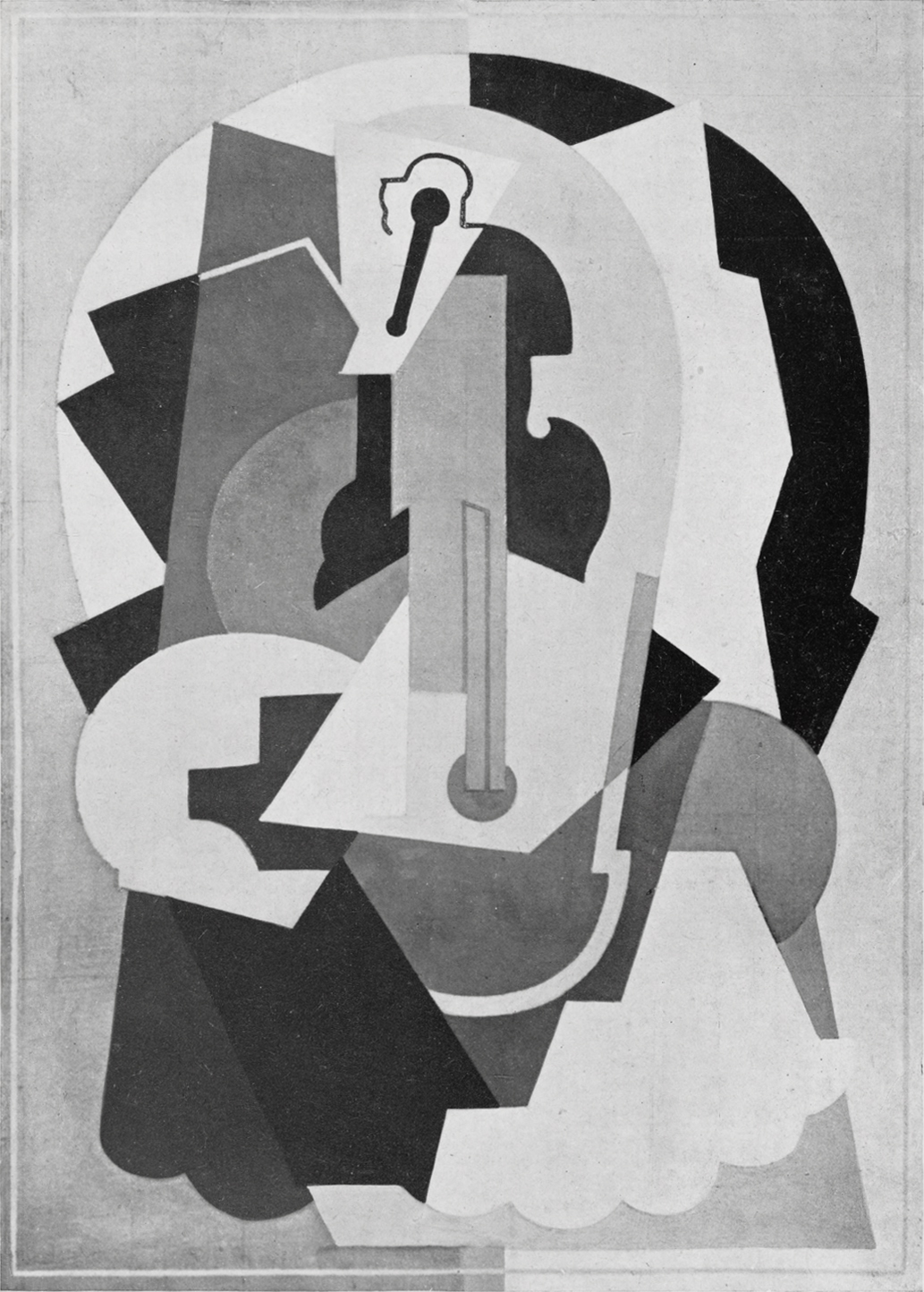
Albert Gleizes, 1920, Ecuyère (Horsewoman), oil on canvas, 130 x 93 cm, Musée des Beaux-Arts de Rouen, published in Broom, An International Magazine of the Arts, November 1921. This 1920 painting was reworked in 1923

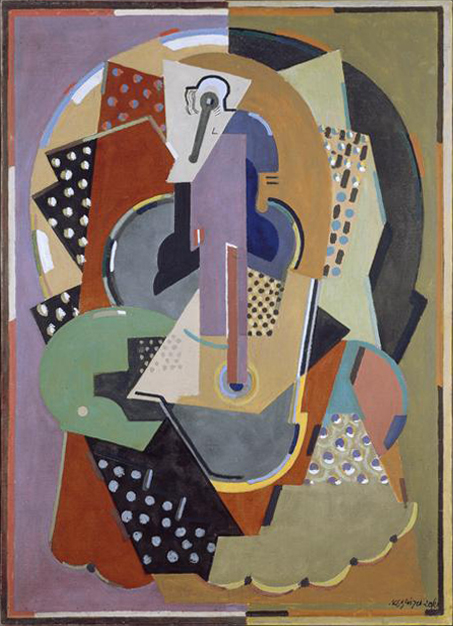
Albert Gleizes, 1920–23, Ecuyère (Horsewoman), oil on canvas, 130 x 93 cm, Musée des Beaux-Arts de Rouen (Purchased from the artist in 1951. Dépôt du Centre Pompidou, 1998). This 1920 painting was reworked in 1923

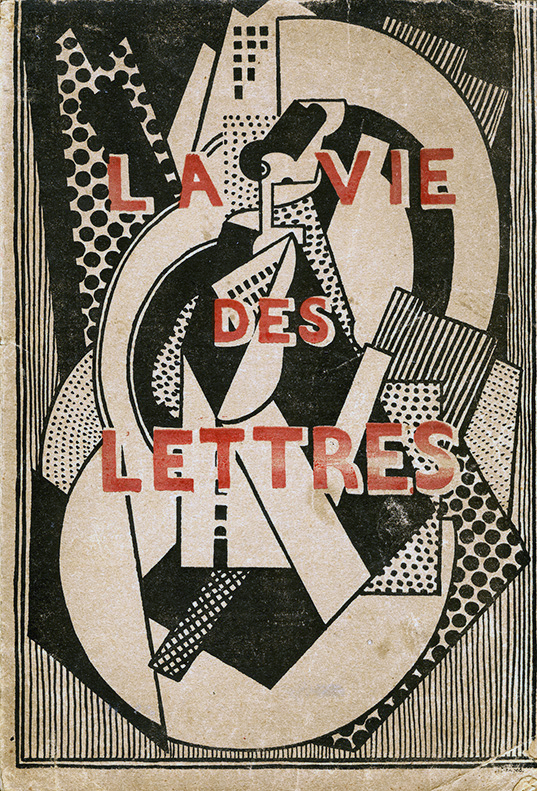
Albert Gleizes, c.1920, L'Homme dans les maisons, cover illustration of La Vie des Lettres et des Arts, Jacques Povolozky & Cie, Paris, 1920

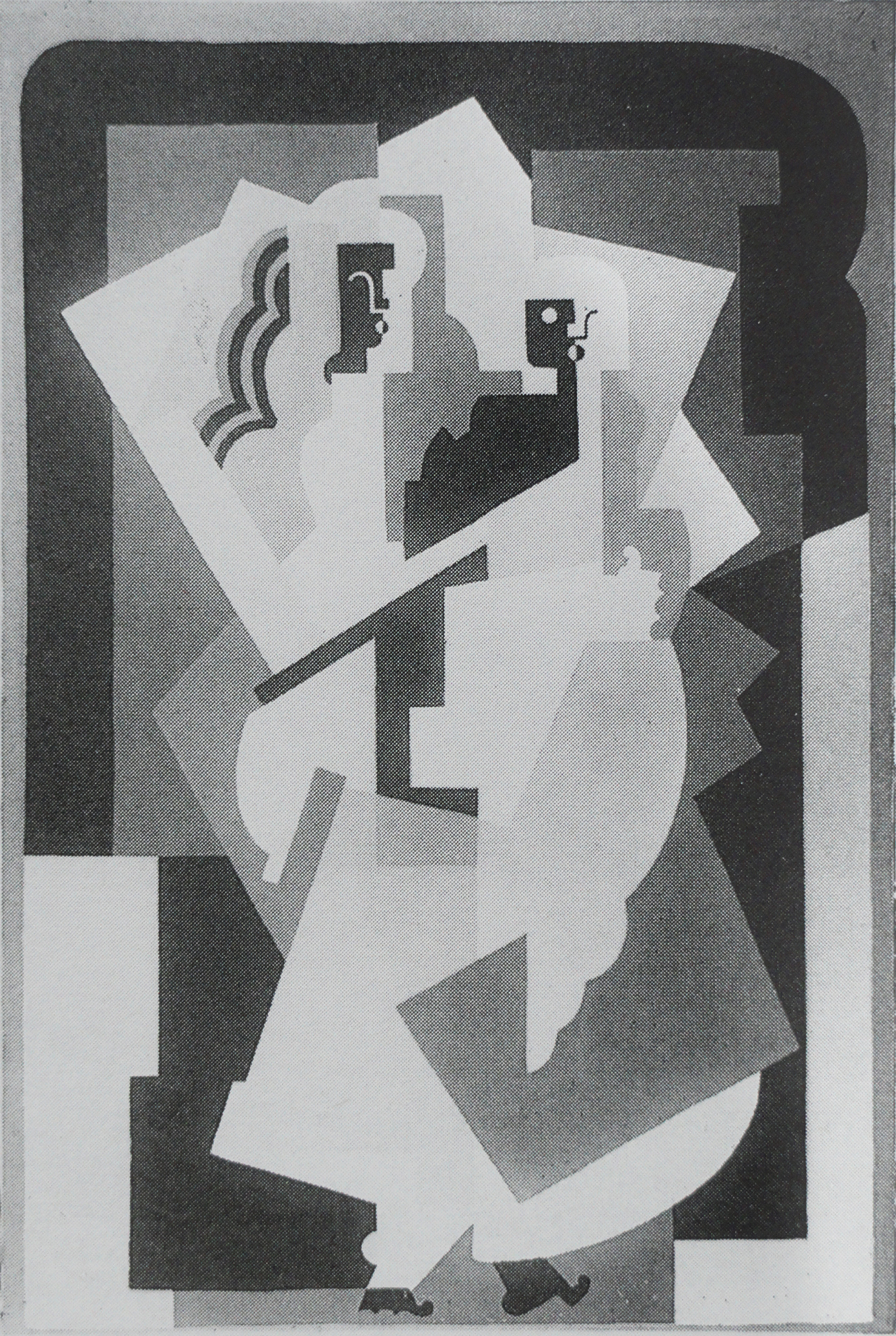
Albert Gleizes, 1920, Femme portant un enfant, Exposition Internationale d'Art Moderne, Geneva, 26 December 1920 - 25 January 1921, No. 185

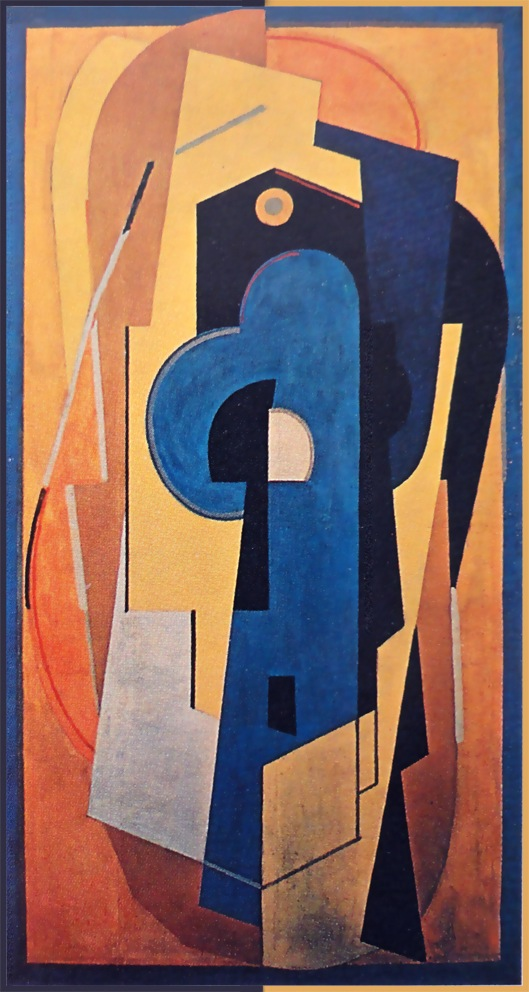
Albert Gleizes, 1921, Composition bleu et jaune (Composition jaune), oil on canvas, 200.5 x 110 cm

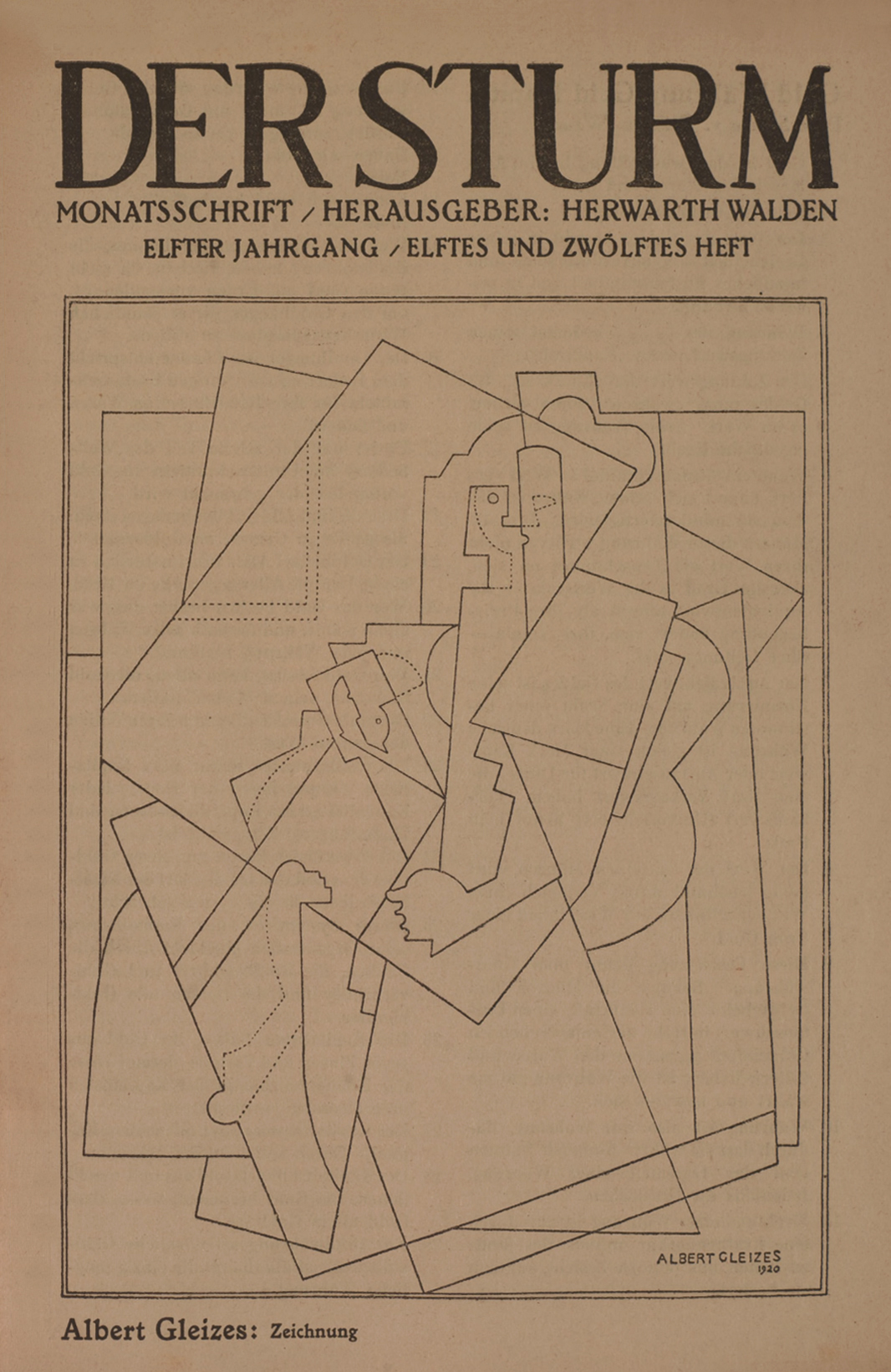
Albert Gleizes, untitled, drawing (zeichnung), published in the cover of Der Sturm, Volume 11, Number 11-12, 5 December 1920

== See also ==
- List of works by Albert Gleizes

== Selected exhibitions ==
- Salon d'Automne, Grand Palais, Paris, 15 October – 12 December 1920
- Marlborough Gallery, London, 1956, no. 13 (as Femme Assise)
- Musee Calvet, Avignon, 1962, no. 17
- Musee de Grenoble, 1963, no. 23.
