= Harvest Threshing =

Painting by Albert Gleizes

- Le Dépiquage des Moissons (French)
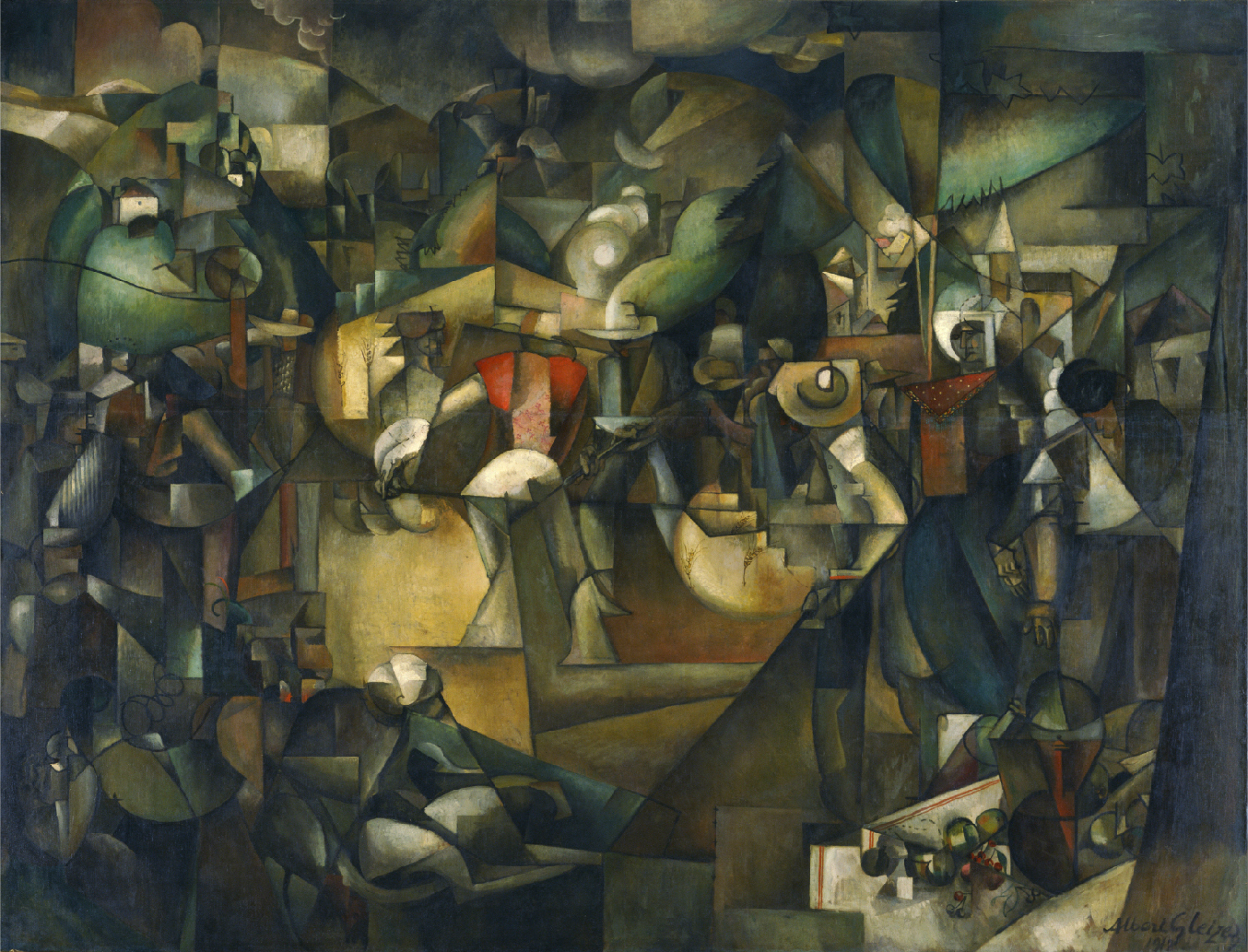
- Artist: Albert Gleizes
- Year: 1912
- Medium: Oil on canvas
- Dimensions: 269 cm × 353 cm (105.9 in × 139 in)
- Location: National Museum of Western Art, Tokyo

Le Dépiquage des Moissons, also known as Harvest Threshing, and The Harvesters, is an immense oil painting created in 1912 by the French artist, theorist and writer Albert Gleizes (1881–1953). It was first revealed to the general public at the Salon de la Section d'Or, Galerie La Boétie in Paris, October 1912 (no. 43). This work, along with La Ville de Paris (City of Paris) by Robert Delaunay, is the largest and most ambitious Cubist painting undertaken during the pre-War Cubist period. Formerly in the collection of the Solomon R. Guggenheim Museum in New York, this monumental painting by Gleizes is exhibited at the National Museum of Western Art, in Tokyo, Japan.

== Description ==
The work is an oil painting on canvas with dimensions 269 x 353 cm (106 x 138 in), signed and dated lower right, Gleizes, 1912. "Harvest Threshing", wrote curator and art historian Daniel Robbins for the Gleizes Guggenheim Retrospective in 1964, "summarizes Gleizes' interest in presenting an epic panorama of mountains, valleys, clouds and smoke, towns, workers and wheat, a simultaneous celebration of the harvest, nature and man in idealistic harmony." Gleizes' painting, as Henri Le Fauconnier's Abundance, likely takes its theme from the social and synthetic program of the Abbaye de Créteil, and too, from the poem of Henri-Martin Barzun, La Montagne, Poèmes légendaires, part 5 of La Terrestre Tragedie (Paris, Mercure de France, 1908): Les Moissonneurs dans les Epis, armes de faux et de faucilles... (pp. 49–56).

Panorama Meudon, Issy-les-Moulineaux and Paris, View from Terrasse de Meudon, early 20th-century postcard

La Moisson, C.L.C, early 20th-century postcard

While the still-life and nude are common themes of pre-World War I Cubism, the work of Gleizes is characterized by ambitious subjects: the harvest, the hunt, the city, and, later, Broadway in New York City, and the Brooklyn Bridge (1915, Guggenheim, New York), one of his most abstract paintings of this period. Gleizes took this, according to Peter Brooke, as symbolic of the need to express the whole vast drama, the collection of unprecedented sensations of modern life. Harvest Threshing represents a big subject, rich in plastic possibilities. The interest of the painting resides in its rich and complex fabric of interwoven latticework, with 'the institution of relations between straight lines and curves' or the 'thousand surprises of fire and of shadow' proposed in Du "Cubisme" (co-authored with Jean Metzinger in 1912). The subject matter is entirely, as Le Fauconnier and Gleizes himself says, 'a pretext'.

As Peter Brooke points out, a pencil transcription done to scale by Geneviève Dalban reveals the greatness of the construction. "The 'duration' that has been so much talked about is entirely a matter of the length of time that can be spent looking at it, as one thing leads to another, in and out and round about, in an endless visual dance. It is a mark of the failure of the Cubist revolution – its hi-jacking by the champions of the subject – that nearly one hundred years later there are writers on art who can see in such a picture only peasants, a church tower, a rustic meal, mountains, clouds..."

== Background ==
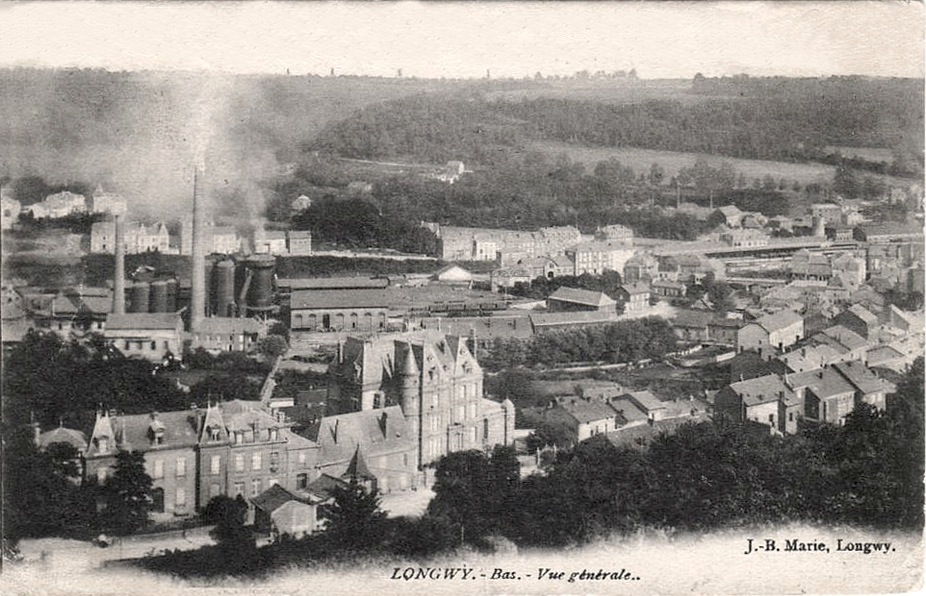
Longwy Bas. Vue générale, (Longwy à Longuyon, usines, 1904), postcard

Oeuvre Parisienne des Enfants a la Montagne. "C'est la Moisson!", early 20th-century postcard

In this painting can be observed the summing up of all present in the art of Georges Seurat: "the line, independent of its topographical role, possesses an assessable abstract value", it represented the furthest extension of Paul Cézanne's preoccupations: his will to deconstruct, his revolt against imitation and refusal of Renaissance perspective.

Much as that of Les Baigneuses and Man on a Balcony (Portrait of Dr. Théo Morinaud) painted the same year, the subject matter of Harvest Threshing—a semi-urban landscape that possesses both rural and semi-industrial components, juxtaposing sharply contrasting elements of both traditional and modern life—is derived from an unsentimental observation of the world. On the one hand the artist makes allusion to the traditional process of threshing—a step in grain preparation after harvesting and before winnowing, now mostly done by machine—and on the other, the artist includes elements from a society in the process of inexorable industrialization. Yet the compositional relationships between the two are formally resolved. The representation of this transition between classical tradition and contemporary life was noticeably of interest to Gleizes, as it was to other artists of the Section d'Or.

"The organic process of life and civilization, moving irresistibly toward harmonious interaction," wrote Robbins, "was the subject of Gleizes' art." It was treated neither as a "confined symbolic allegory nor as a cultural background indicated by specific real appearance, but was instead presented in concrete and precise terms. Gleizes' Harvest Threshing, the masterpiece of the Section d'Or (no. 34), is not merely an anecdote in a scene. Rather, it is a multiple panorama celebrating the worker, his material life and his collective activity in securing that life on a permanently changing land. Gleizes confronts us not with one action or place, but with many: not with one time, but with past and future as well as present."(Robbins, 1964)

== In contrast to Picasso and Braque ==
Georges Braque, Fruit Dish and Glass, papier collé and charcoal on paper, 1912

L'Aveyron, Decazeville, 1918, Les Usines, postcard

Gleizes had no intention of analyzing and describing neutral objects from daily life; a bowl of fruit, a pipe, violin or guitar. His 'empathetic' consciousness and complex idealistic concepts of the world led him to portray—rather than 'mundane' objects—subjects of vast proportion, of provocative social and cultural significance. For Gleizes, consciousness and reality could meet and reconcile on the surface of the canvas. There is no period that corresponds closely to the analytic Cubism developed by Picasso and Braque in the work of Gleizes, as of Delaunay, Le Fauconnier and Léger. The iconography of these artists, in contrast to that of Picasso and Braque, helps elucidate the reasons. At the same time, iconography explains how Gleizes and Delaunay were to become abstract painters, theoretically closer to Wassily Kandinsky and Piet Mondrian than to Picasso, Braque or even Gris.

Gleizes intended to reconstitute and synthesize the real-world according to his own consciousness. Important factors in this process were the relationships and interactions between volumes to convey solidity, structure, weight, placement. Also important was a principal lesson of Cézanne: the indivisibility of form and color; a change in one would alter the other.

Unlike that of Picasso and Braque, the work of Gleizes always involved the synthetic treatment of broad subjects. He gave equal attention to each section of canvas. As a consequence, almost a year after the completion of The Harvesters, Gleizes would develop compositional innovations: broad tilting planes that provide a transition from the outer rectangles to the rotating forms at the core of the work.

Gleizes was aware of the differences between his interests and those of Picasso and Braque. He wrote an article after seeing Picasso's work for the first time (in 1911). After quoting Apollinaire about returning to the principles of structure, color and inspiration, he wrote that the "valuable [précieuses] indications of Picasso and Braque, in spite of everything, did not depart from an impressionism of form which, nevertheless, they opposed (an impressionism of) color."

== Du "Cubisme" ==
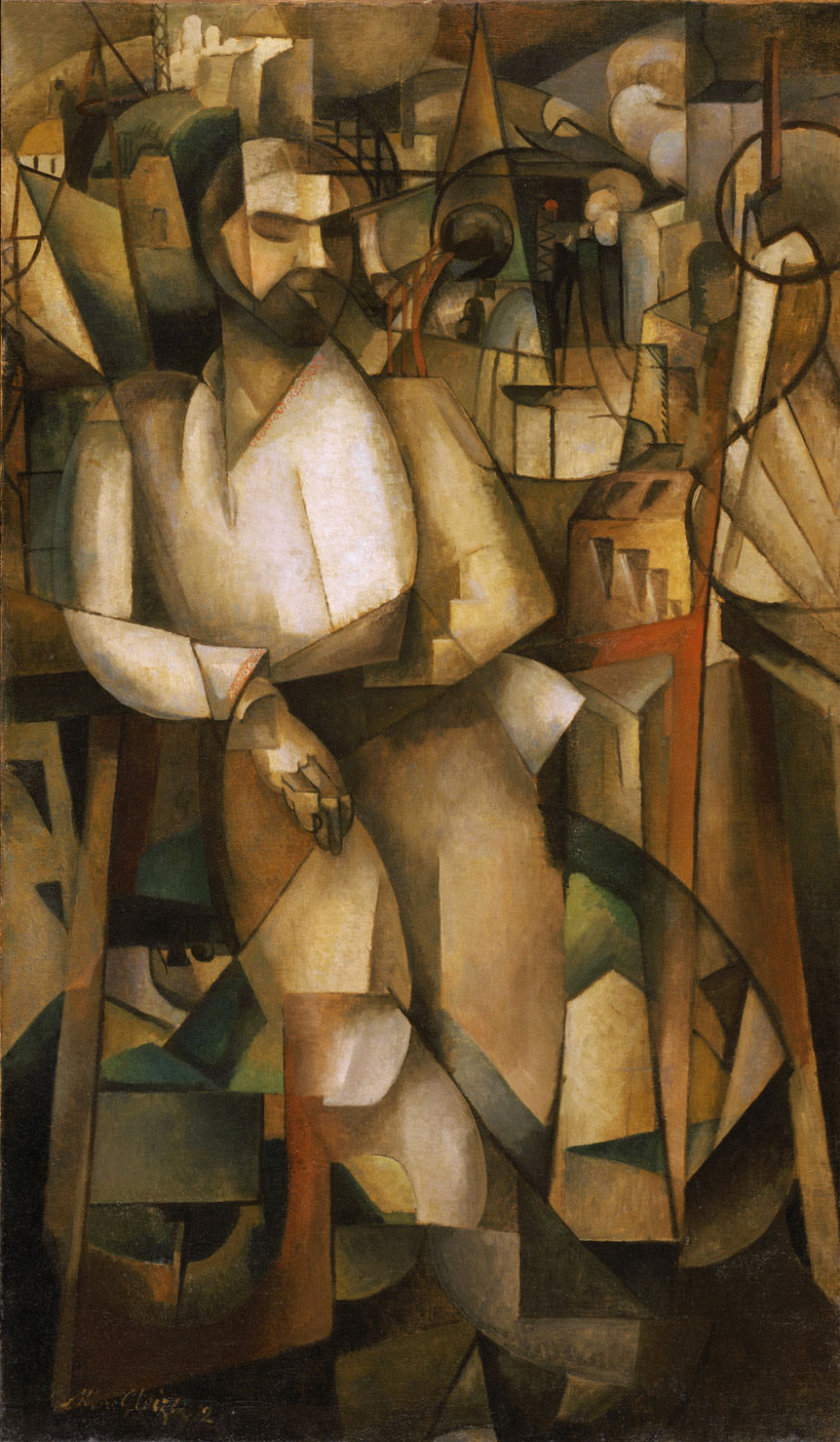
Albert Gleizes, 1912, l'Homme au Balcon, Man on a Balcony (Portrait of Dr. Théo Morinaud), oil on canvas, 195.6 x 114.9 cm (77 x 45 1/4 in.), Philadelphia Museum of Art. Exhibited at Salon d'Automne, Paris, 1912, Armory Show, New York, Chicago, Boston, 1913. The setting: an urban backdrop of bridge-girders, smokestacks and train tracks viewed from the balcony of a surgeon's office, avenue de l'Opéra, Paris

In preparation for the Salon de la Section d'Or, and in the wake of their controversial showing at the Salon des Indépendants in the spring of 1911, Albert Gleizes and Jean Metzinger published a major defense of Cubism and the first theoretical essay on the new movement, entitled Du "Cubisme".

Passages of their text which attempted to reconcile goals and methods of modern painting were read to the circle around the Duchamp brothers (the Puteaux group) during the summer of 1912 and it was published before the conclusion of the Salon de la Section d’Or, where Gleizes exhibited his monumental Cubist painting The Harvesters. Gleizes believed that artists could explain themselves in writing as well as (or better than) critics. He continued writing throughout the following years as Du "Cubisme" enjoyed wide circulation within a continuously growing circle of artists and connoisseurs. By placing the artist at the centre of society, Albert Gleizes, along with a generation of painters from diverse classes and nations, helped revolutionize the bourgeois canons. By observing and thinking, as opposed to serving solely as an ornamenter, Gleizes concluded, the artist realized a fundamental service to humanity.

Shortly after the 1912 publication of Du "Cubisme", Guillaume Apollinaire published Les Peintres Cubiste (1913, written in 1912), in which he wrote "Majesty: this is what, above all, characterizes the art of Albert Gleizes. [...] This majesty arouses and provokes the imagination; considered from the plastic point of view, it is the immensity of things. [...] The pictures of Albert Gleizes are realized by a force of the same sort as that which realized the Pyramids and the Cathedrals, the constructions in metal, the bridges and the tunnels."

== Provenance ==
- Solomon R. Guggenheim (acquired from the artist in 1938)

At the outset of 1938, Gleizes learned that the religious community that owned Moly Sabata, a large house he had rented in Sablons, was ready to sell. Despite his success at the 1937 Exposition Internationale des Arts et Techniques dans la Vie Moderne, he lacked the funds necessary to purchase the house. In August, however, the American collector, Solomon R. Guggenheim purchased a large number of paintings directly from Gleizes, including his pre-war Cubist masterpiece, Le Dépiquage des Moissons; a work he hoped would have been taken by a museum in France.

- Solomon R. Guggenheim Museum, New York; Sold to a Parisian Gallery, 1988
- Galerie Odermatt-Cazeau and/or Galerie Malingue, Paris, 1988
- Private Collections, Paris, 1989
- National Museum of Western Art, in Tokyo, Japan

== See also ==
- List of works by Albert Gleizes

== Exhibition history ==
- 1912 La Section d'Or, Galerie de la Boétie, Paris, 10 October 1912 - 30 October 1912, no. 43
- 1926 Trente ans d'Art indépendant, Grand Palais, Paris, 20 February 1926 - 21 March 1926, cat. no. 1058
- 1947 Albert Gleizes, 50 ans de peintre, Chapelle du lycée Ampére, Lyon, 15 November - 14 December 1947, p. 19
- 1964 Albert Gleizes, 1881-1953: A Retrospective Exhibition, Solomon R. Guggenheim Museum, New York, September 1964 - October 1964, cat. no. 34
- 1964 Albert Gleizes, 1881–1953, Musée national d'art moderne, Paris, 15 December 1964 - 31 January 1965, no. 16
- 1965 Albert Gleizes, 1881-1953: Retrospektive, Museum am Ostwall, Dortmund, 13 March 1965 - 25 April 1965, no. 16
- 2001 Albert Gleizes: le cubisme en majesté, Museu Picasso, Barcelona, 28 March 2001 - 5 August 2001, Musée des Beaux-Arts, Lyon, 6 September - 10 December 2001, cat. no. 35

== Bibliography ==
- 1912 Hourcade, Olivier. Courrier des Arts. Paris-Journal. Oct. 10–30, 1912, no. 43.
- 1938 Les Beaux-Arts. August, 1938, repr. p. 2.
- 1950 Gray, Cleve. "Gleizes". Magazine of Art. vol. 43, no. 6, October, 1950, pp. 207–210, repr. p. 208.
- 1959 Golding, John. Cubism: A History and an Analysis 1907-1914. New York/London, 1959, repr. no. 74B.
- 1964 Robbins, Daniel. Albert Gleizes 1881-1953, A Retrospective Exhibition (exh. cat.). The Solomon R. Guggenheim Museum, New York, 1964, pp. 12–25, repr. in color, p. 47, no. 34.
- 1964 Kuh, Katharine. "Albert Gleizes: Underrated Cubist". Saturday Review. 31 October 1964, pp. 32–33.
- 1964 Robbins, Daniel. "Gleizes as a Way of Life". Art News. No. 63, September, 1964, pp. 25–27ff, repr. p. 27.
- 1967 West, Richard V. Painters of Section d'Or: The Alternatives to Cubism (exh. cat.). Albright-Knox Art Gallery, Buffaro, 1967, repr. p. 58.
- 1968 Golding, John. Cubism: A History and an Analysis 1907-1914. 2nd ed., London, 1968, pp. 161, repr. no. 74B.
- 1970 Cooper, Douglas. The Cubist Epoch. New York, 1970, pp. 73–74, repr. col., plate 65.
- 1975 Robbins, Daniel. The Formation and Maturity of Albert Gleizes, 1881 through 1920. Dissertation, New York University
- 1976 Panorama du Cubisme. Paris, 1976, p. 30, repr. col.
- 1976 Rudenstine, Angelica Zander. The Guggenheim Museum Collection: paintings, 1880-1945. vol. 1, New York, 1976, pp. 140–142, repr. p. 141, no. 47.
- 1979 Yaegashi, Haruki. Sekai no Bijutsu. Cubism. Vol. 63, Tokyo, Jun. 1979, p. 70, rper. col. "Harvest Threshing (Le Dépiquage des moissons)"
- 1980 Yaegashi, Haruki. Kindai no Bijutsu. Cubism. Vol.56, Tokyo, 1980, p. 53, repr. col. no. 56, "Harvest Threshing (Le Dépiquage des moissons)"
- 1982 Daix, Pierre. Journal du Cubisme. Geneve, 1982, p. 87, repr.
- 1982 Albert, Pierre. Albert Gleizes: Naissance et avenir du cubisme. Saint-Etienne, 1982, p. 88.
- 1985 Cottington, David. Cubism and the Politics of Culture in France 1905-1914. Dissertation, Courtauld Institute of Art, University of London, 1985,
- 1988 Golding, John. Cubism: A History and an Analysis 1907-1914. 3rd ed., Cambridge, MA, 1988, pp. 170–171, repr. no. 83B.
- 1989 Gersh-Nesic, Beth S. The Early Criticism of André Salmon, A Study of His Thought on Cubism. Dissertation, City University of New York, 1989, repr. no. 4.
- 1993 Antliff, Mark. Inventing Bergson: Cultural Politics and the Parisian Avant-Garde. Princeton, 1993, repr. p. 130.
- 1993 Franscina, Francis. "Realm and Ideology: An Introduction to Semiotics and Cubism". Primitivism, Cubism, Abstraction: The Early Twentieth Century. Harrison, Charles et al. New Haven/ London, 1993, p. 154, repr. no. 131.
- 1998 Varichon, Anne et al. Albert Gleizes 1881-1953, Catalogue Raisonné. Paris, 1998, p. 145, repr. col. no. 397.
- 1998 Massent, Michel. Albert Gleizes, 1881-1953. Paris, 1998, p. 120, repr. p. 118.
- 1998 Cottington, David. Cubism in the Shadow of War: The Avant-garde and Politics in Paris, 1905-1914. New Haven/London, 1998, p. 120, repr. col. p. 118, no. 28.
- 2000 Cox, Neil. Cubism. London, 2000, p. 216, repr. col. no. 122.
- 2000 Green, Christopher. Art in France 1900-1940. New Haven/ London, 2000, pp. 198–199, repr. col. p. 198, no. 234.
- 2000 Briend, Christian. "Albert Gleizes au Salon de la Section d'or de 1912". La Section d'or 1912, 1920, 1925 (exh. cat.). Paris, 2000, pp. 71–75.
- 2000 Hourcade, Olivier. "Courrier des Arts" (reprint). La Section d'or 1912, 1920, 1925 (exh. cat.). Musées de Châteauroux/Musée Fabre, Montpellier, Édition Cercle d'Art, 2000–2001, pp. 309–310.
- 2001 Antliff, Mark; Leighten, Patricia. Cubism and Culture. London/New York, 2001, pp. 126–167, repr. col. p. 124, no.102.
- 2001 Brooke, Peter. Albert Gleizes, For and Against the Twentieth Century. New Haven/London, 2001, pp. 35–39, repr. col. p. 35, no. 18.
- 2001 Briend, Christian; Brooke, Peter et al.. Albert Gleizes: Le cubisme en majesté (exh. cat.). Museu Picasso, Barcelona/Musée des Beaux-Arts, Lyon, 2001, pp. 48–49, repr. col. no. 35.
- 2002 Briend, Christian. "Between Tradition and Modernity: The Cubist Work of Albert Gleizes". Albert Gleizes: Cubism in Magesty (exh. cat.). Centro Cultural de Belém, Lisbon, 2002–2003, pp. 53–75, repr. p. 60, no. 9.
- 2003 Cox, Neil. Cubism. Tokyo, 2003, pp. 215–216, repr. p. 216. (Japanese Translation.)
- 2004 Cottington, David. Cubism and its Histories. Manchester/ New York, 2004, pp. 94–95, repr. col. no. XI.
- 2006 Annual bulletin of the National Museum of Western Art. No. 39 (Apr. 2004-Mar. 2005), 2006, Tanaka, Masayuki. New Acquisitions. pp. 9–13, List of New Acquisitions. p. 38, repr.
