= The Publisher Eugène Figuière =

Painting by Albert Gleizes

- Portrait de l'éditeur Eugène Figuière (French)
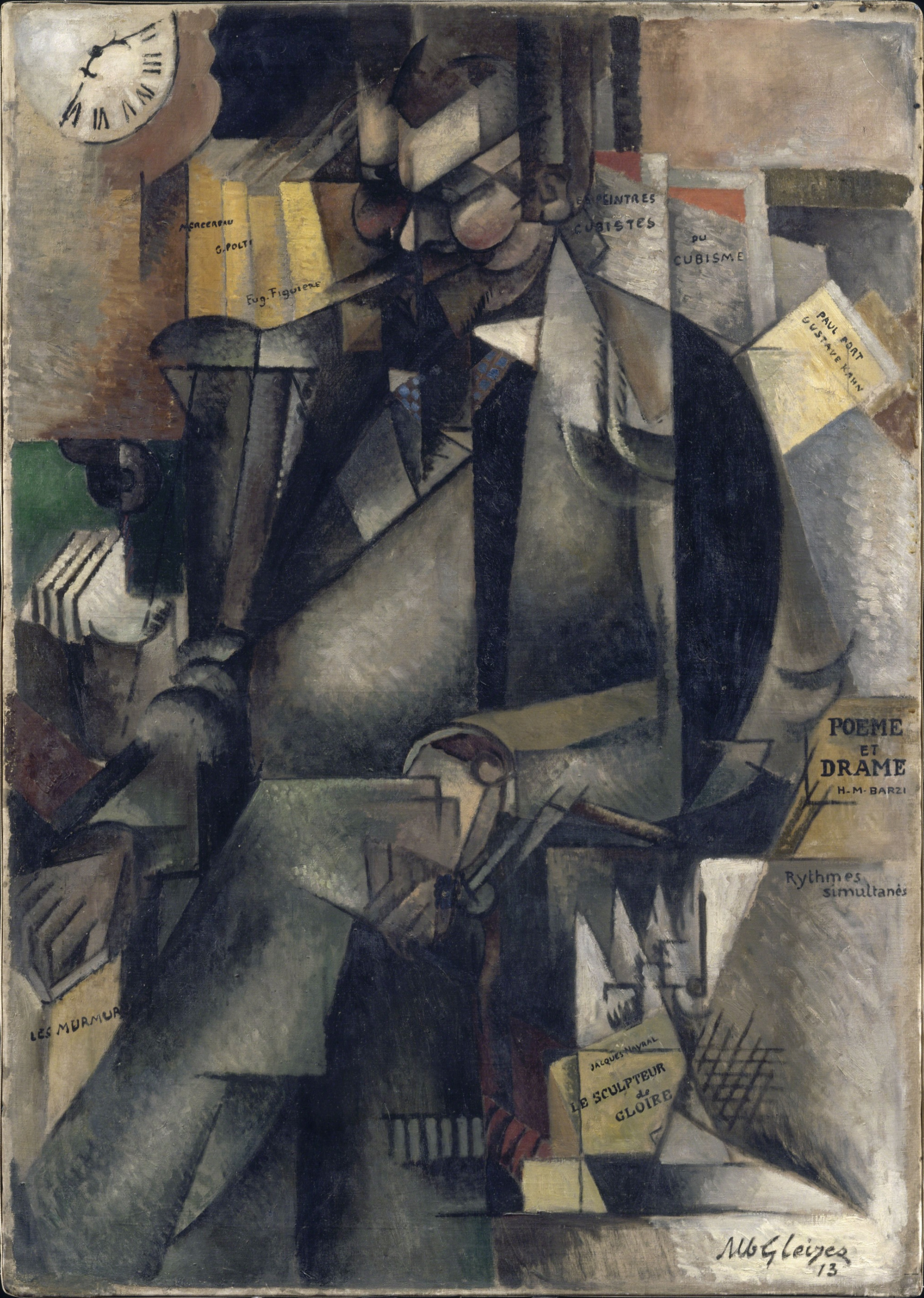
- Artist: Albert Gleizes
- Year: 1913
- Medium: Oil on canvas
- Dimensions: 143.5 cm × 101.5 cm (56.5 in × 40 in)
- Location: Museum of Fine Arts of Lyon, Lyon

The Publisher Eugène Figuière (French: Portrait de l'éditeur Eugène Figuière) is a painting created by the French artist Albert Gleizes, from 1913. This work was exhibited at the Salon d'Automne, 1913 (no. 768) and Moderni Umeni, 45th Exhibition of SVU Mánes in Prague 1914 (no. 47), and several major exhibitions the following years. Executed in a highly Cubist idiom, the work nevertheless retains recognizable elements relative to its subject matter. The painting, reproduced in Comœdia, 14 November 1913, represents Eugène Figuière. Head of his own publishing company, Figuière strove to be identified with every modern development. In 1912 he published the first and only manifesto on Cubism entitled Du "Cubisme", written by Albert Gleizes and Jean Metzinger. In 1913 Figuière published Les Peintres Cubistes, Méditations Esthétiques (The Cubist Painters, Aesthetic Meditations), by Guillaume Apollinaire. The painting, purchased directly from the artist in 1948, is in the permanent collection of the Museum of Fine Arts of Lyon, France.

== Description ==
Portrait of Eugène Figuière is an oil painting on canvas with dimensions 143.5 by 101.5 cm (56.5 x 40 inches) signed and dated "Alb Gleizes 13", lower right. Studies for this work likely began during the spring or summer of 1913 while the full portrait was completed during the late summer or early fall of 1913. The work represents Eugène Figuière who is closely associated with Gleizes' friends from the Abbaye de Créteil, Jacques Nayral and Alexandre Mercereau.

Eugène Figuière, head of his own publishing company, strove to be identified with every modern development. In this portrait which Salmon admired for its "fine and most adroit psychology", he is surrounded by his publications which were written by Gleizes' friends: Alexandre Mercereau, Georges Polti, Guillaume Apollinaire, Jean Metzinger, Paul Fort, Gustave Kahn, Henri-Martin Barzun and Jacques Nayral.

In this picture Gleizes merges the sitter with the environment, blurring the distinction between background and foreground. In addition to the simultaneous views and multiple perspective, the artist has included the image of a clock in the upper left quadrant (as in Metzinger's Nu à la cheminée, Nude of 1910), a fact that reveals Gleizes' didactic visual and literary reference to the mathematician and philosopher of science Henri Poincaré, and to the philosopher Henri Bergson's concept of 'duration'.

Outlining his practice at the time, in an essay published in February 1913 in Montjoie! Gleizes writes:

It is sufficient for me to say, quickly, that painters today only consider the object in relation to the totality of things and, with regard to itself, in relation to the totality of its aspects. As they are not unaware of the fact that a form which is more pronounced dominates those which are less pronounced, the plastic dynamism will be born from the rhythmic relations of objects to objects, as with the different aspects of one and the same object, juxtaposed—not superposed, as some would like to believe—with all the sensibility and taste of the painter for whom those are the only rules. (Gleizes, 1913)

== Eugène Figuière ==
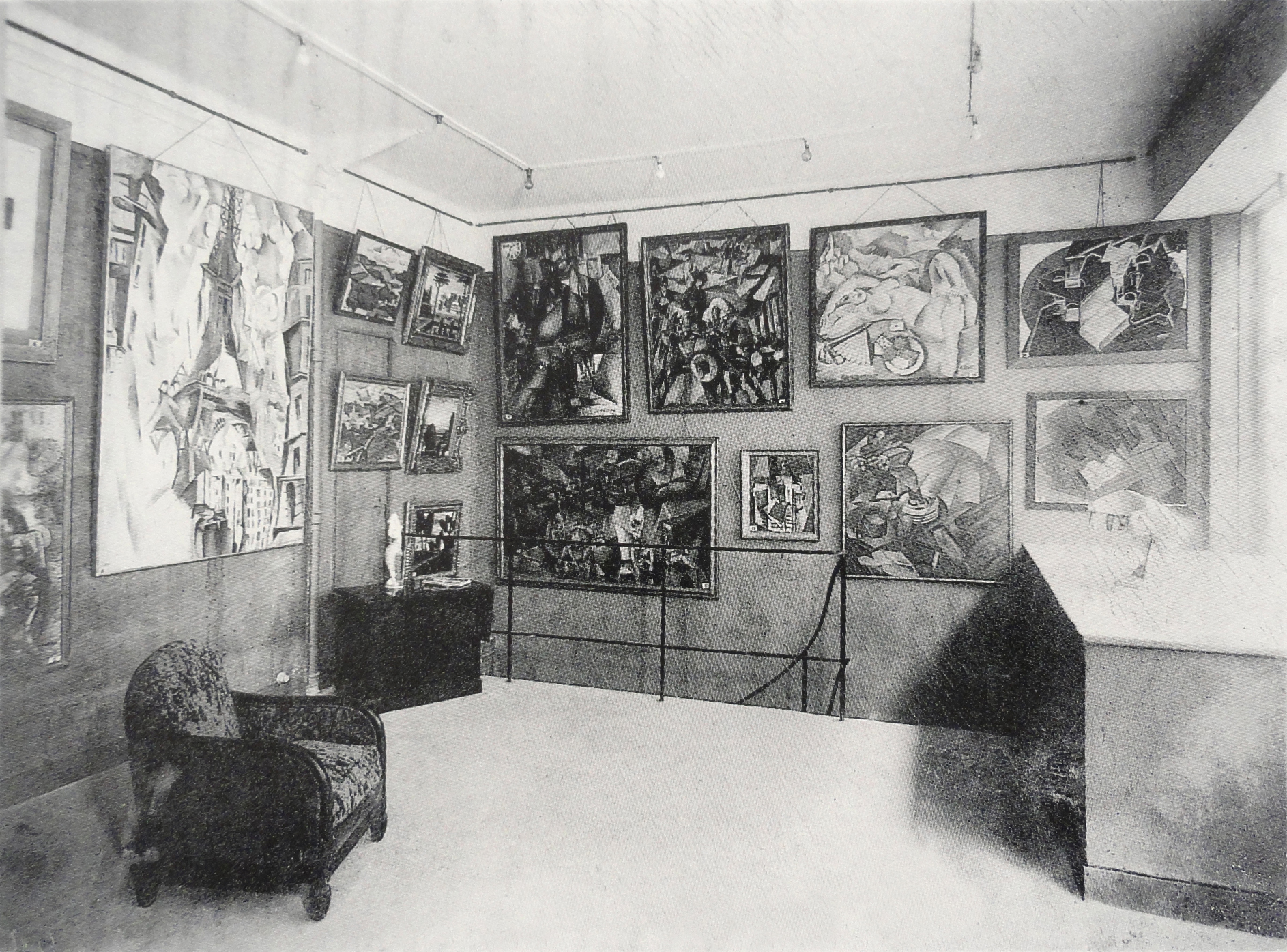
La Section d'Or exhibition, 1925, Galerie Vavin-Raspail, Paris. Gleizes' Portrait de Eugène Figuière, La Chasse (The Hunt), and Les Baigneuses (The Bathers) are seen towards the center

La Revue Indépendante began publication in June 1911 under the patronage ('Dépôt générale') of Eugène Figuière, later publisher of Du "Cubisme" and of Apollinaire's Aesthetic Meditations - The Cubist Painters. According to Gladys Fabre, Figuière's publishing house opened in 1910 was a successor, via the Bibliothèque des douze and the Oeuvres du jour to the Abbaye de Créteil's own publishing house which, after the closure of the Abbaye itself in 1908, had continued in Paris. The contributors included the poet Paul Fort together with Alexandre Mercereau, Paul Castiaux, H.M. Barzun, Roger Allard and, quite prominently, Jacques Nayral, Gleizes' friend and later brother in law, subject of the great portrait which must have been done about this time. Nayral had contributed previous pieces in the series L'Art et ses représentants, on Mahler and on the writer Gaston Deschamps (1861–1931). Daniel Robbins' Albert Gleizes, 1881-1953, A Retrospective Exhibition, Guggenheim, 1964, mentions another article in the series by Gleizes, on Le Fauconnier, but this does not seem to have appeared in print.

=== Major publications ===
- Allard, Roger, Le Bocage ou le divertissement des amants citadins et champetres, Paris, "Oeuvres et jours", Figuière, 1911. Illustrated with woodcuts by Gleizes, dating from 1910.
- Mercereau, Alexandre, La Littérature et les idées nouvelles, Paris, Figuière, 1912.
- Barzun, Henri-Martin, L'Ere du Drame, Essai de Synthèse Poétique Moderne, Figuière, 1912
- Nayral, Jacques, ed. Le Figuier, (Bulletin officiel des publications Eugène Figuière), Paris, no. 1, October,1912. Announces Du "Cubisme".
- Granié, Joseph, "Du Cubisme", Le Figuier, (Bulletin officiel des publications Eugène Figuière), Paris, nos. 3—1, December, 1912, January, 1913, p. 29.

==== Poetry ====
- Les Murmures, Bibliothèque générale d'édition, 1909
- Et des jours ont passé
- Les Bréviaires
- La Forêt sans feuilles, Eugène Figuière éditeur, 1920
- Les Poèmes de mai, Eugène Figuière éditeur, 1919
- Le Manoir, Eugène Figuière éditeur, 1922, ill. Gaude Roza
- Des murmures dans les ruines, Eugène Figuière éditeur, sd

==== Prose ====
- Les Clochers démolis, Dixmude, 1915-1916, Eugène Figuière éditeur, 1916
- Notre bréviaire, Eugène Figuière éditeur, 1927
- Walt Whitman, poète américain, suivi des Meilleures pensées de Walt Whitman, recueillies et traduites par Ary René d'Yvermont, Eugène Figuière éditeur 1928
- L'École de bonheur. Le bonheur en huit leçons, Eugène Figuière éditeur, 1930
- Sur les routes de la vie, Eugène Figuière éditeur, 1935
- L'Art oratoire, Eugène Figuière éditeur, 1937

== 1913 ==
Du "Cubisme" is translated into English: Cubism, Unwin, London, 1913. Gleizes exhibits in the Armory Show in New York, Chicago and Boston, introducing Cubism to an American audience. An essay by him, Le Cubisme et la Tradition, attacking the Italian Renaissance and its influence on French art, is published by the Italian born Riccardo Canudo (1877–1923) in his journal, Montjoie!. Figuière publishes a collection of essays by Apollinaire, Les Peintres Cubistes, Méditations Esthétiques. Apollinaire uses the word 'la majesté' to characterise Gleizes. In the Salon d'Automne Gleizes exhibits Portrait de Figuière and La Ville et le Fleuve, a monumental successor to Le Dépiquage des Moissons (Harvest Threshing) (it has since been lost). At the Salon, Canudo introduces him to Juliette Roche (1884–1982), daughter of a powerful government minister, Jules Roche, and a member of the circle which is portrayed in Proust's A la recherche du temps perdu.

Albert Gleizes writes in 1925:

The year 1913 saw the movement continuing to evolve. The changes it had already undergone since the Indépendants of 1911 could leave people in no doubt as to its nature. Cubism was not a school, distinguished by some superficial variation on a generally accepted norm. It was a total regeneration, indicating the emergence of a wholly new cast of mind. Every season it appeared renewed, growing like a living body. Its enemies could, eventually, have forgiven it if only it had passed away, like a fashion; but they became even more violent when they realised that it was destined to live a life that would be longer than that of those painters who had been the first to assume the responsibility for it.

At the 1913 Salon des Indépendants could be seen a very large work of Jean Metzinger's - L'Oiseau Bleu; Robert Delaunay showed L'Equipe de Cardiff; two important canvasses from Léger; still lifes and L'Homme au Café from Juan Gris; enthusiastic new work from La Fresnaye and from Marcoussis, and from others again; and finally, from myself, Les Joueurs de Football.

Again, to the Salon d'Automne of 1913 - a salon in which Cubism was now the predominating tendency - Metzinger sent the great picture called En Bâteau (En Canot, Im Boot), La Fresnaye La Conquête de l'Air, myself Les Bâteaux de Pêche and La Ville et le Fleuve. If the first moment of surprise had passed by, the interest Cubism excited was as great as ever. The anger and the enthusiasm had not changed sides, our enemies held to their guns. It is enough for proof to read the diatribes of Louis Vauxcelles in Gil Blas for that year,1913, and the panegyrics of Guillaume Apollinaire in L'Intransigeant.

== Salon d'Automne, 1913 ==
By 1913 the predominant tendency in modern art visible at the Salon d'Automne consisted of Cubism with a clear tendency towards abstraction. The trend to use brighter colors that had already begun in 1911 continued through 1912 and 1913. This exhibition, held from 15 November to 8 January 1914, was dominated by de La Fresnaye, Gleizes and Picabia. Works by Delaunay, Duchamp and Léger were not exhibited.

The preface of the catalog was written by the French Socialist politician Marcel Sembat who a year earlier—against the outcry of Jules-Louis Breton regarding the use of public funds to provide the venue (at the Salon d'Automne) to exhibit 'barbaric' art—had defended the Cubists, and freedom of artistic expression in general, in the National Assembly of France.

"I do not in the least wish... to offer a defense of the principles of the cubist movement! In whose name would I present such a defense? I am not a painter... What I do defend is the principle of the freedom of artistic experimentation... My dear friend, when a picture seems bad to you, you have the incontestable right not to look at it, to go and look at others. But one doesn't call the police!" (Marcel Sembat)

=== Criticism ===
In a review of the 1913 Salon d'Automne published in The Burlington Magazine, the critic Robert E. Dell writes:

As for the ultra-orthodox Cubists such as M. Gleizes, they are becoming very tiresome. Someone who knows M. Eugène Figuière assured me that he saw a strong resemblance in M. Gleizes's portrait of that eminent publisher, who must, in that case, be made of gun-metal or some similar substance. It may be my stupidity, but I cannot understand what this sort of thing means or what the artist is driving at. There are a few other paintings which may, presumably, be called Cubist in default of any better name, which are merely patterns in bright colours, such as M. Picabia's and M. Metzinger's. One of M. Metzinger's pictures is a puzzle made up of a leg, an arm, a hat, a parasol, and various other objects, and is called En Canot. These patterns have certain decorative qualities and might do for a carpet or a hanging, but they are absurd in frames, and it is a mere affectation to give them titles.

== See also ==
- List of works by Albert Gleizes

== Exhibitions ==
- Salon d'Automne, 1913, no. 768.
- Moderni Umeni, S.V.U., Manes, Prague, 1914, no. 47.
- La Section d'Or, 1925, Galerie Vavin-Raspail, Paris
- Les Maîtres de l'art indépendant, 1895–1937, Paris, 1937, p. 94, no. 16.
- Galerie Drouant-David, Paris, 1943, no. 12.
- Galerie des Garets, Paris, 1947, no. 1.
- Chapelle du Lycee Ampere, Lyon, 1947, no. 4.
- Le Cubisme, Musée National d'Art Moderne, Paris, 1953, no. 119.
- Les Sources du XXe Siecle, Musée National d'Art Moderne, Paris, 1961.
- Exposition d'Art Français 1840–1940, National Museum of Western Art, Tokyo, 1961–62, no. 366.
- The Solomon R. Guggenheim Museum, New York, Albert Gleizes, 1881-1953, A Retrospective Exhibition, September - October 1964, no. 42; this exhibition travelled to Paris, Musée National d'Art Moderne, December 1964 - January 1965, and Dortmund, Museum am Ostwall, March - April 1965.
- Le cubisme, 17 October 2018 – 25 February 2019, Galerie 1, Centre Pompidou, Musée National d'Art Moderne, Paris. Kunstmuseum Basel, 31 March – 5 August 2019

== Literature ==
- André Warnod, Le Salon d'Automne, Comœdia, 14 November 1913 (reproduced)
- Salmon, André, Le Salon d'Automne, Montjoie, nos. 11–12, 1913, pp. 3–5.
- Allard, Roger, Les Ecrits Français, 1913, p. 3.
- Gleizes, Albert, Kubismus, Munich, 1928, p. 9.
- Cogniat, Raymond, and George, Waldmar, Roger de La Fresnaye, Paris, 1949, p. 40.
- Barzun, Henri-Martin, Orpheus; modern culture and the 1913 renaissance: painting & sculpture, architecture & crafts, music- the novel ... A panoramic survey 1900-1956, Print. by Liberal Press, 1956, p. 9
- Deroudille, René, Bulletin des Musées Lyonnais, 1956, no. 1, p. 12.
- Vincent, Madeleine, Catalogue du Musée de Lyon, 1956, p. 315.
- Rosenblum, Robert, Cubism and Twentieth-century Art, New York, 1960, no. 117.
- Robbins, Daniel, The Solomon R. Guggenheim Museum, New York, Albert Gleizes, 1881-1953, A Retrospective Exhibition, catalogue, September - October 1964, no. 42
