= The Banks of the Marne (Gleizes) =

Painting by Albert Gleizes

- Bords de la Marne (French)
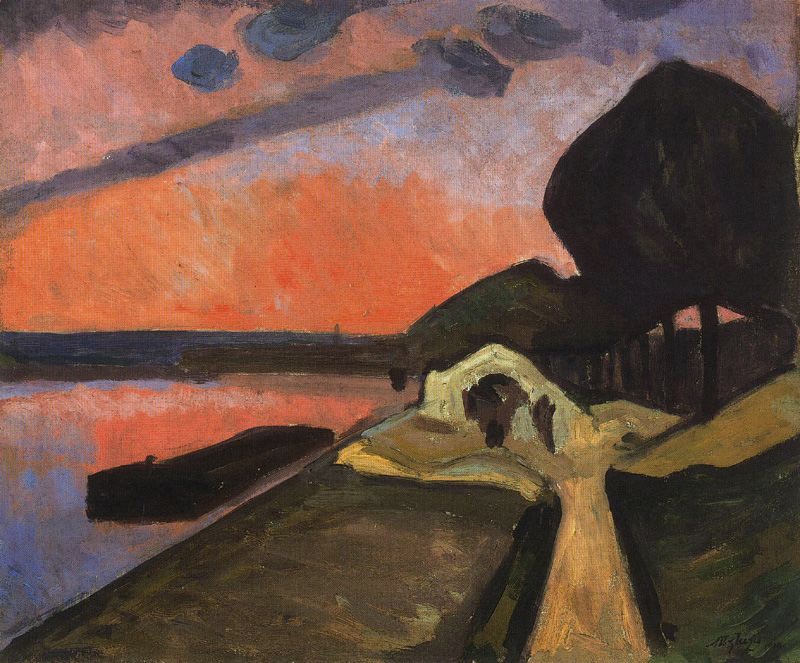
- Artist: Albert Gleizes
- Year: 1909
- Medium: Oil on canvas
- Dimensions: 54 cm × 65 cm (21.25 in × 25.6 in)
- Location: Museum of Fine Arts of Lyon; Lyon

The Banks of the Marne (French: Bords de la Marne) is a proto-Cubist oil painting on canvas created in 1909 by the French artist Albert Gleizes. In this work can be seen a departure from the representation of the observable world. The development of Cubist and abstract art in the work of Gleizes was necessarily a transformation from the synthetic preoccupation with his subject matter. The passage of Gleizes' painting from an epic visionary figuration to total abstraction was foreshadowed during his proto-Cubist period. Bords de la Marne measures 54 × 65 cm, and is currently in the permanent collection of the Musée des Beaux-Arts de Lyon.

== History ==
Gleizes' preoccupation for solidly constructed form is already manifest in his Fauve-like works between 1907 and 1909. Under the influence of Paul Cézanne, Symbolism, Pont Aven and Les Nabis, Gleizes produced some of his first Proto-Cubist paintings.

Bords de la Marne and other painting by Gleizes during this phase are close to the work of Henri Le Fauconnier, though the artist did not know each other at the time.

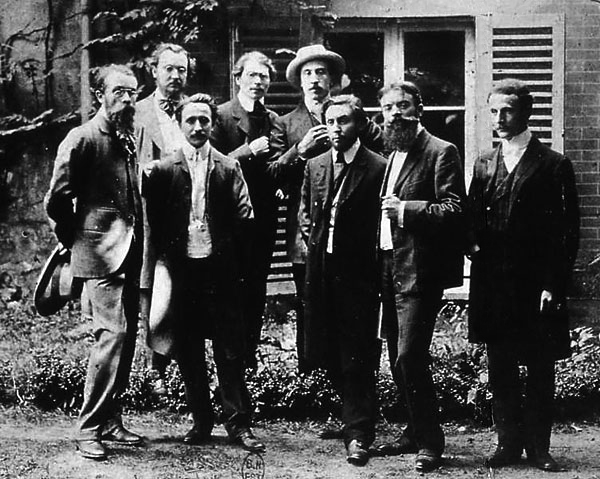
Abbaye de Créteil 1906 : First row- Charles Vildrac, René Arcos, Albert Gleizes, Henri-Martin Barzun, Alexandre Mercereau. Second row- Georges Duhamel, Berthold Mahn, d'Otémar

Gleizes and the former members of the Abbaye de Créteil (notably Jules Romains, Henri-Martin Barzun and René Arcos) dreamed of a synthetic concept of the possibilities of the future, one of "collectivity, multiplicity and simultaneity" writes art historian Daniel Robbins: "Their vision invariably encompassed broad subjects which, although dealing with reality, were restricted neither by the limitations of physical perception nor by a separation of scientific fact from intellectual meaning—even symbolic meaning. Even their images of simultaneity were synthetic because scope was too vast, both physically and symbolically, for one man's limited participation".

== Structural rhythms ==
Between 1905 and 1908, Gleizes transited through Impressionism and Neo-Impressionism with a brief passage though Fauvism. By 1909 he began simplifying both his color and form. These paintings were parallel to the written and verbal ideas propounded at the Abbaye de Créteil.

Experienced in the treatment of inclusive landscapes (writes Robbins), he nevertheless had to solve the problem of balancing many simultaneous visions on a painted surface. Gleizes mitigated the distortion of distance by linear perspective, by flattening the picture plane; his skies were on the same plane as the simple flat objects in front and, although scale was retained, a form in the distance would be brought to the foreground by making it bright. Every element of the painting had to be reduced to clear planes, treated as uniformly as possible...

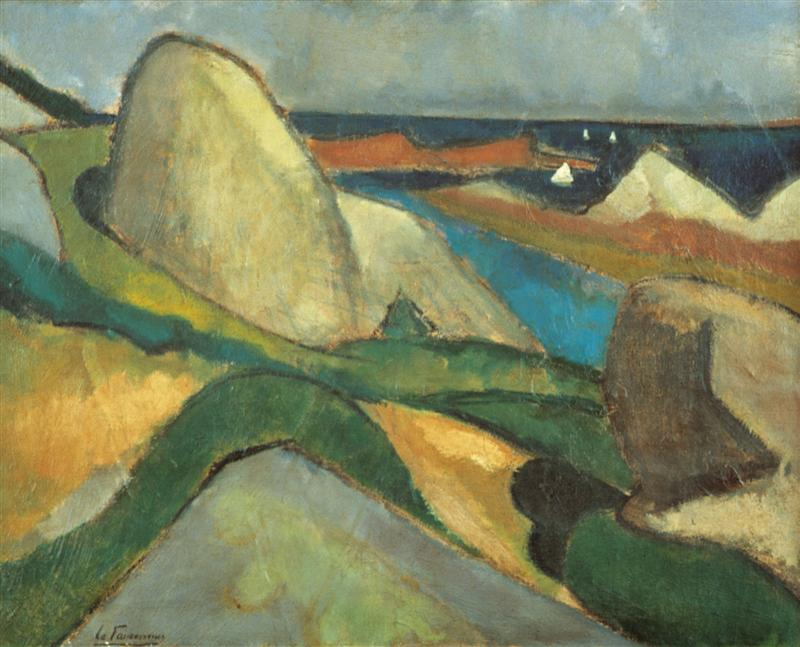
Henri le Fauconnier, 1908, Ploumanac'h, Museum Kranenburgh, Bergen, the Netherlands

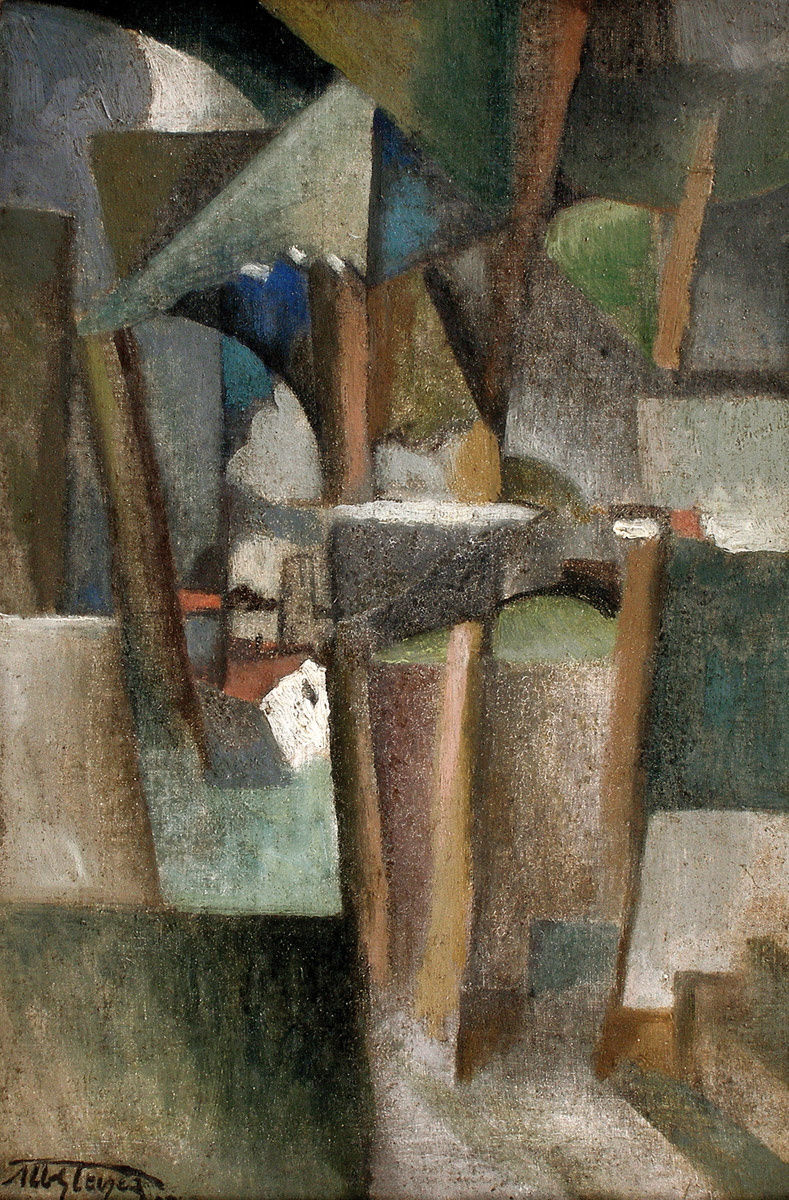
Albert Gleizes, 1910, Les Arbres (The Trees), oil on canvas, 41 × 27 cm. Reproduced in Du "Cubisme", 1912

According to Gleizes, Mercereau introduced him to Jean Metzinger in 1910; the year Mercereau organized the Jack of Diamonds Exhibition in Moscow. Before Gleizes and Metzinger had met, they were both single out by Louis Vauxcelles, who wrote disparaging comments about their "cubes Blafards" possibly regarding Metzinger's Portrait of Apollinaire and Gleizes' L'Arbre (The Tree) (1910), both exhibited at the Salon des Indépendants.

Before 1911 a group of artists formed through the Mercereau connection, including Allard, Barzun, Beauduin, Castiaux, Jouve, Divoire, Parmentier, Marinetti, Brâncuși, Varlet, Apollinaire and Salmon.

In his preface to the 1911 Brussels Indépendants, Apollinaire wrote:

...thus has come a simple and noble art, expressive and measured, eager to discover beauty, and entirely ready to tackle those vast subjects which the painters of yesterday did not dare to undertake, abandoning them to the presumptuous, old-fashioned and boring daubers of the official Salons.

Unlike the style and subject matter of Picasso and Braque, the paintings of Albert Gleizes, Le Fauconnier, Robert Delaunay, Fernand Léger and others of the Mercereau group favored vast scenes (epic themes) representing modern life.

Allard wrote of Gleizes, Le Fauconnier and Metzinger, in a review of the 1910 Salon d'Automne:

Thus is born at the antipodes of impressionism an art which cares little to imitate the occasional cosmic episode, but which offers to the intelligence of the spectator the essential elements of a synthesis in time, in all its pictorial fullness.

== See also ==
- List of works by Albert Gleizes
