= Man in a Hammock =

Painting by Albert Gleizes

- L'Homme au hamac (French)
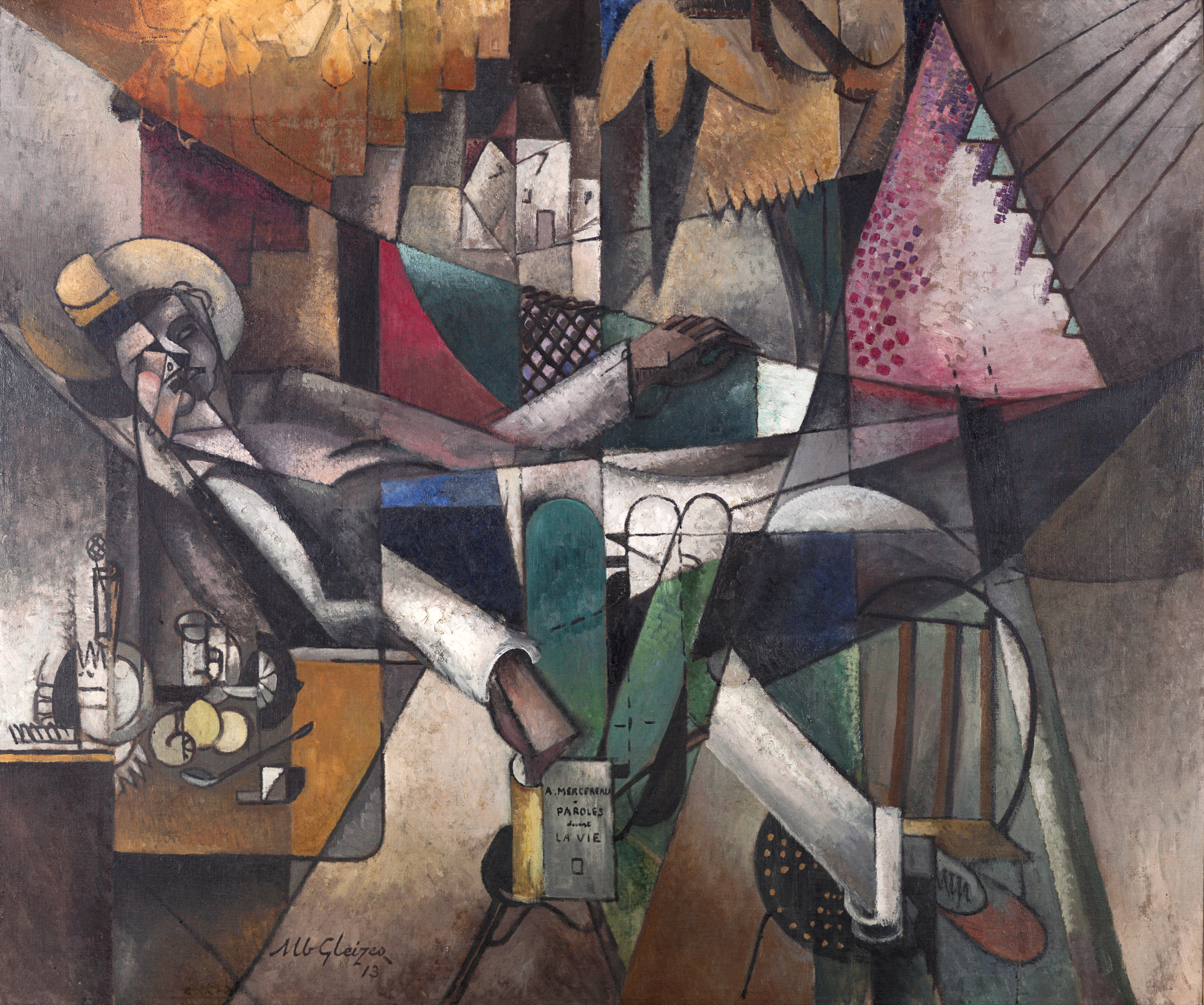
- Artist: Albert Gleizes
- Year: 1913
- Medium: Oil on canvas
- Dimensions: 130 cm × 155.5 cm (51.2 in × 61.2 in)
- Location: Albright-Knox Art Gallery, Buffalo

Man in a Hammock (French: L'Homme au hamac) is a painting created by the French artist Albert Gleizes, from 1913. The work was exhibited at Moderni Umeni, SVU Mánes, Vystava, Prague, February – March 1914, no. 41; and Der Sturm, Berlin, July – August 1914. The painting was mentioned by Guillaume Apollinaire in Paris-Journal, 3 July 1914. It was later reproduced in Albert Gleizes, L'Épopée, Le Rouge et le Noir, October 1929, p. 81, and Chroniques d'Art, 1960, p. 405. Stylistically Gleizes' painting exemplifies the principle of mobile perspective laid out in Du "Cubisme", written by himself and French painter Jean Metzinger. Evidence suggests that the man reclining in the hammock is indeed Jean Metzinger. Formerly in the collection of Metzinger, the first owner of the painting, Man in a Hammock forms part of the permanent collection of the Albright-Knox Art Gallery, Buffalo, New York.

== Description ==
Man in a Hammock is an oil painting on canvas with dimensions 130 by 155.5 cm (51.2 x 61.2 inches) signed and dated "Alb Gleizes 13", lower left. Painted in 1913, the work "presents an interesting synthesis of back and forth motion," writes art historian Daniel Robbins (Guggenheim, 1964), "and introduces a composition based on the intersection of powerful diagonals". Man in a Hammock is related to a number of other works, such as a watercolor and a sepia ink over pencil drawing from 1909, a pencil and ink dated 1913, in addition to at least three other works in various media. A large and finished painting of L'Homme au hamac dating from the summer of 1909 is on the reverse of Houses among Trees, 113.5 x 154 cm, 1910. In both the proto-Cubist version and in a small oil sketch (formerly in the collection of Ida Bienert, Dresden) the man wears a large sombrero.

== Portrait of Jean Metzinger ==
Left: Photograph of Jean Metzinger circa 1912. Right: Man in a Hammock by Albert Gleizes, 1913, detail

The reclining figure is clearly readable. His face is seen both from a profile and frontal view simultaneously. While this property of seeing multiple facial features at once is rare in the work of Gleizes, it is seen quite often in the works of Metzinger. The figure is situated in a landscape setting that recedes to buildings typical of Parisian suburbs around 1910 in the upper center background of the canvas. In the foreground, the sitter's right leg is supported by a Paris-style park chair. The table placed next to the sitters right arm—portrayed as if seen from above in accord with the non-Euclidean geometry first pronounced by Paul Cézanne—supports various elements; a vase, a glass, some fruit (perhaps lemons) and a spoon. The long spoon, according to Christian Briend (Musée National d'Art Moderne, Paris), is a reference to the principle accessory of Metzinger's seminal 1911 Le goûter (Tea Time); dubbed by André Salmon "La Joconde du Cubisme" (The Mona Lisa of Cubism).

Gleizes utilizes a multitude of colors—unlike the limited palette often associated with early Cubism—ranging from large areas of ochre, red, white and blue, surrounding the grisaille figure.

The man represented in the painting is very likely a portrait of Jean Metzinger. The book entitled Paroles devant la vie, held prominently by the model was written by Alexandre Mercereau in 1913. Gleizes had collaborated in founding the Abbaye de Créteil, and was very familiar with Mercereau's writings. Metzinger wrote an important text about Mercereau in 1911. It was Mercereau who introduced Gleizes to Metzinger in 1910. Mercereau's publisher, Eugène Figuière, a year earlier had published Du "Cubisme", the Cubist manifesto written by Gleizes and Metzinger.

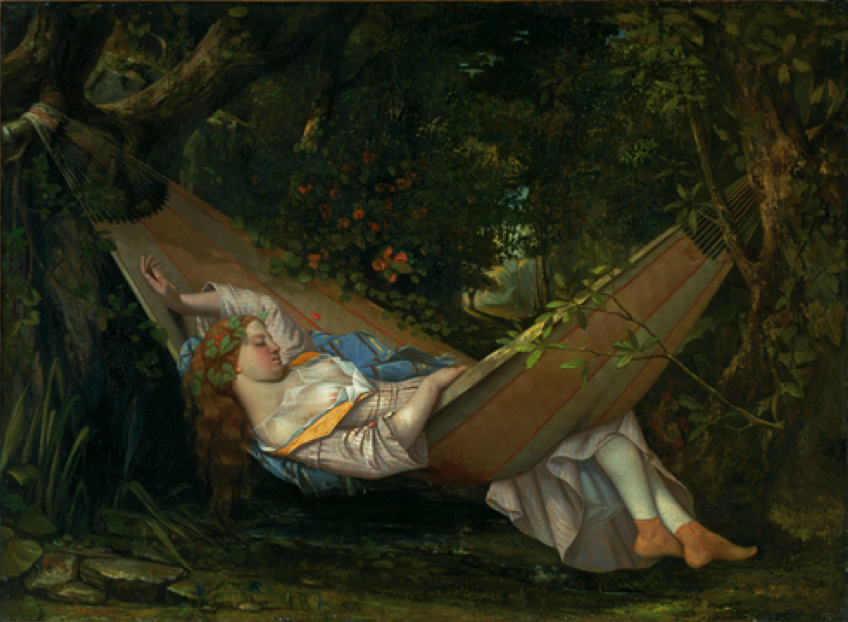
Gustave Courbet, 1844, Le Rêve (The Hammock), oil on canvas, 70.5 × 97 cm, Museum Oskar Reinhart, Switzerland

In Gleizes' painting, one does not merely see a figure swinging in a hammock; one sees multiple aspects of the same figure simultaneously refracted into new pictorial language. Mercereau attempted to represent facets of time in his writings, much as Gleizes and Metzinger attempted to represent facets of space, time and form in their paintings.

Man in a Hammock integrates the man into the landscape, forming a single image by virtue of a non-linear grid. This device is used by Gleizes very skillfully to accommodate all aspects of the scene. Mercereau's book, the still-life next to the sitter, the man, and the environment are all symbols of fundamental importance to Gleizes, an artist who rarely, if ever, contented himself with mundane subjects (a guitar, violin, or a bowl of fruit).

Man in a Hammock is testament to the close association of two artists, Metzinger and Gleizes, and to their shared social, cultural and philosophical conviction that painting represented more than a fleeting glimpse of the world in which they lived, that indeed by showing multiple facets of a subject captured at successive intervals in time simultaneously, a truer more complete image would emerge. The Buffalo AKG Art Museum describes the composition that merges the human figure, landscape and still life, arranged across several planes along a linear grid.

'We feared the dogmas and hermetic ideas, destructive acts disguised as new constructions, before they appeared as we knew they would. Rejecting nothing, we sketched out a traditional curve in French painting from Courbet to ourselves as the latest arrivals, persuaded that the new order cannot be created independently of the permanent order'. (Albert Gleizes, 1917)

== See also ==
- List of works by Albert Gleizes

== Provenance ==
- Jean Metzinger
- Mme Russo
- Sidney Janis Gallery, 1957
- Purchased by Albright Art Gallery, February 22, 1957

== Exhibitions ==
- Moderni Umeni, S.V.U., Manes, Prague, 1914, no. 41
- Der Sturm, Berlin, July, 1914

== Literature ==
- Guillaume Apollinaire, Paris-Journal, 3 July 1914, cf. Chroniques d'Art, 1960. p. 405
- Albert Gleizes, L'Epopee, Le Rouge et le Noir, October, 1929, p. 81
- Painting and sculpture from antiquity to 1942, Albright-Knox Art Gallery, Steven A. Nash - 1979
- The Saturday Review, 1965
- Albert Gleizes, 1881-1953: A Retrospective Exhibition, Solomon R. Guggenheim Museum - 1964
- Saturday Review, Henry Seidel Canby, Bernard Augustine De Voto, George Cooper Stevens - 1965
- Painters of the Section d'Or: The Alternatives to Cubism. Exhibition September 27-October 22, 1967, Albright-Knox Art Gallery, Buffalo, New York - 1967
- Gallery Notes, Albright-Knox Art Gallery - 1970
- Masterworks at the Albright-Knox Art Gallery, Albright-Knox Art Gallery, Karen Lee Spaulding - 1999
- 125 masterpieces from the collection of the Albright-Knox Art Gallery, Karen Lee Spaulding, Albright-Knox Art Gallery - 1987
- Gallery Notes, Buffalo Fine Arts Academy - 1958
- The Guggenheim Museum collection: paintings, 1880-1945, Solomon R. Guggenheim Museum, Angelica Zander Rudenstine - 1976
- Albert Gleizes: Catalogue Raisonné, Albert Gleizes, Anne Varichon, Daniel Robbins - 1998
- L'Oeil, Georges Bernier, Rosamond Bernier - 1999
- Albert Gleizes et le dessin: 11 December 1970 - 25 January 1971
- André Dubois, Saint-Étienne (Loire, France). Musée d'art et d'industrie - 1970
- Maurice Raynal: la bande à Picasso, David Raynal - 2008
- Gallery Notes, Albright-Knox Art Gallery - 1953
- Œuvres en prose, Guillaume Apollinaire, Michel Décaudin, Pierre Caizergues - 1991
- International Auction Records, 1992
