= Simplismo =

Literary technique developed by Alberto Hidalgo

Simplismo (English: Simplism) is a literary technique, influenced by unanimism, that was developed and employed by Peruvian poet Alberto Hidalgo in the mid-twentieth century. It emphasizes basicity in writing and asserts there is more to be said with less.

== Description ==
Applied, the method seeks to free poetry and literature from everything that hinders its understanding, both literally and figuratively. Some of its main theories include the stripping of all rhetoric, of all stylisation, since it is about returning spontaneity to art, and the beauty of brevity. A key part of this is the use of metaphor. Hidalgo's employment of this trope in his work frequently sees the humanization of things seemingly distant, i.e. technology. Metaphor, in this respect, helps the reader connect with and warm to foreign bodies. Though he never proclaimed it himself, many perceive this practice as futurist, or as at least being influenced by futurism. Critics also classify his compositions as being in direct opposition to surrealism, because simplismo has the tendency to be individualistic and unconcerned with social and political happenings.

For these reasons, Alberto Hidalgo and his simplismo are oft considered pioneers of the literary avant-garde movement in Peru and throughout much of Latin America during the twentieth century. Together with Vicente Huidobro and Jorge Luis Borges, he helped to develop the Índice de la nueva poesía, an index aimed at becoming the canon of avant-garde poetry in Latin America. Innovative and important as this might have been, simplismo had no, and still does not have, followers interested in systematizing, refuting, rethinking or deepening its postulates. Hidalgo’s proposal did not initiate a school or movement, and its influence on Peruvian poetry is not remarkable. However, its early reach touched Enrique Bustamante y Ballivián's Antipoemas (1927).
