= Georges Chennevière =

French poet and playwright

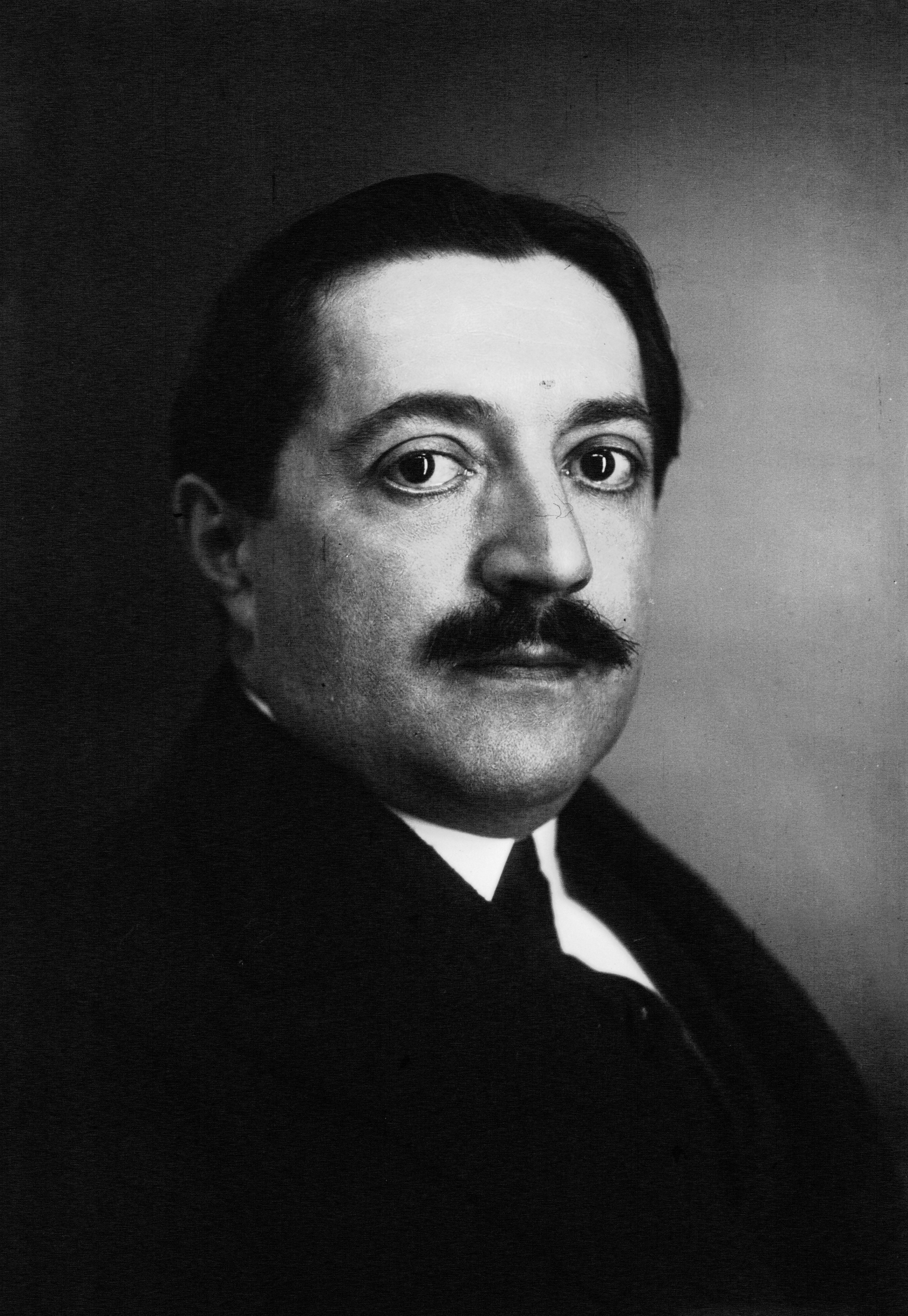
Georges Chennevière in 1920

Georges Chennevière was the pen name of Leon Debille (22 May 1884 in Paris – 21 August 1927 in Paris) a French poet and playwright.

== Biography ==
Georges Chennevière studied at the Lycée Condorcet in Paris, where he met Jules Romains with whom he formed a community of artists called the Abbaye de Créteil beginning in 1905. He was one of the leading poets in the "Unanimism movement". He left a body of poetic work (published by Gallimard and others) and some plays. His Chant de midi (Midday chant) inspired Albert Doyen to compose a body of choral work with organ and orchestra, created in 1919 on the occasion of the Fêtes du Peuple (Celebration of the People). Called to the army in 1914, he served as a soldier then nurse, his experiences at the front fomenting a hatred of war that explained his subsequent commitments. A critic and contributor to magazines such as L'Effort Libre, Les Hommes du Jour, he also participated in the creation of the Clarté movement in 1919 in which he became its secretary. But having closer ties to Romain Rolland than Barbusse, he resigned in June 1919. In July of that year he began writing for L'Humanité where Jules Romains held a literary column. He remained with the paper until the end of 1923, during which he worked as a literary and music critic. Declining to join the French Communist Party, he left the paper for Le Quotidien, a more neutral one.

French critic Christian Senechal noted of him, in the French:

« Georges Chennevière a eu la nostalgie de ce qui triomphe de la fuite implacable du temps, et il l'a dite en des poèmes en vers ou en prose d'une émotion contenue. Mais il ne semble jamais avoir pu croire à une survie personnelle et s'il s'est refusé à ne voir que la « beauté qui (me) cache, en dansant, les abîmes », il a découvert la réalité essentielle dans l'amour, qui flotte au-dessus de tout, avec tendresse « comme l'exhalaison des rivières, le soir ». La foi dans la communauté humaine triomphe ainsi de l'angoisse de la mort. »

(translated: Georges Chennevière yearned for what triumphs from the relentless passage of time, and he expressed that in poems, in verse, or in prose with suppressed emotion. But he never seemed able to believe in personal survival, and if he refused to see anything save the "beauty that hides me, dancing, in the abyss," he discovered the essential reality in love, which floats above all else, with tenderness "like the exhalation of rivers at night." Faith in the human community triumphs just as much as the anguish of death.)

He was the father of the poet André Chennevière, born in 1908, a literary critic for L'Humanité from 1937 to 1939, killed by the Germans during the Liberation of Paris on 20 August 1944.

== Selected publications ==
Poetry

- Le Printemps, Eugène Figuière, 1910
- Appel au Monde, Fêtes du peuple, 1919
- Le Chant de Midi, fête pour la commémoration des morts, A. Leduc, 1919
- Poèmes, 1911-1918, La Maison des Amis du Livre, 1920
- La légende du Roi d'un Jour, NRF - Gallimard, 1927
- Œuvres poétiques, Gallimard, 1929
- Pamir, edition Sagesse, 1933
- Le Cycle des Fêtes, edition Sablier, 1941

Novel

- Le Tour de France, Gallimard, 1929 (first 4 chapters of an unfinished novel)

Theater

- Le Triomphe [unedited, manuscript lost], drama in verse in 5 acts written between 1910 and 1912
- L'impromptu de la Sainte-Cécile [unedited, manuscript lost], comedy in 12 scenes and a prologue, written in 1925
- A.E.I.O.U., Paris, les Humbles, 1931 [published by Louf under the title Deux Farces Inédites]

In collaboration with Jules Romains

- Petit traité de versification, N.R.F., Gallimard, 1923
