= Alexandre Mercereau =

French poet and art critic (1888–1945)

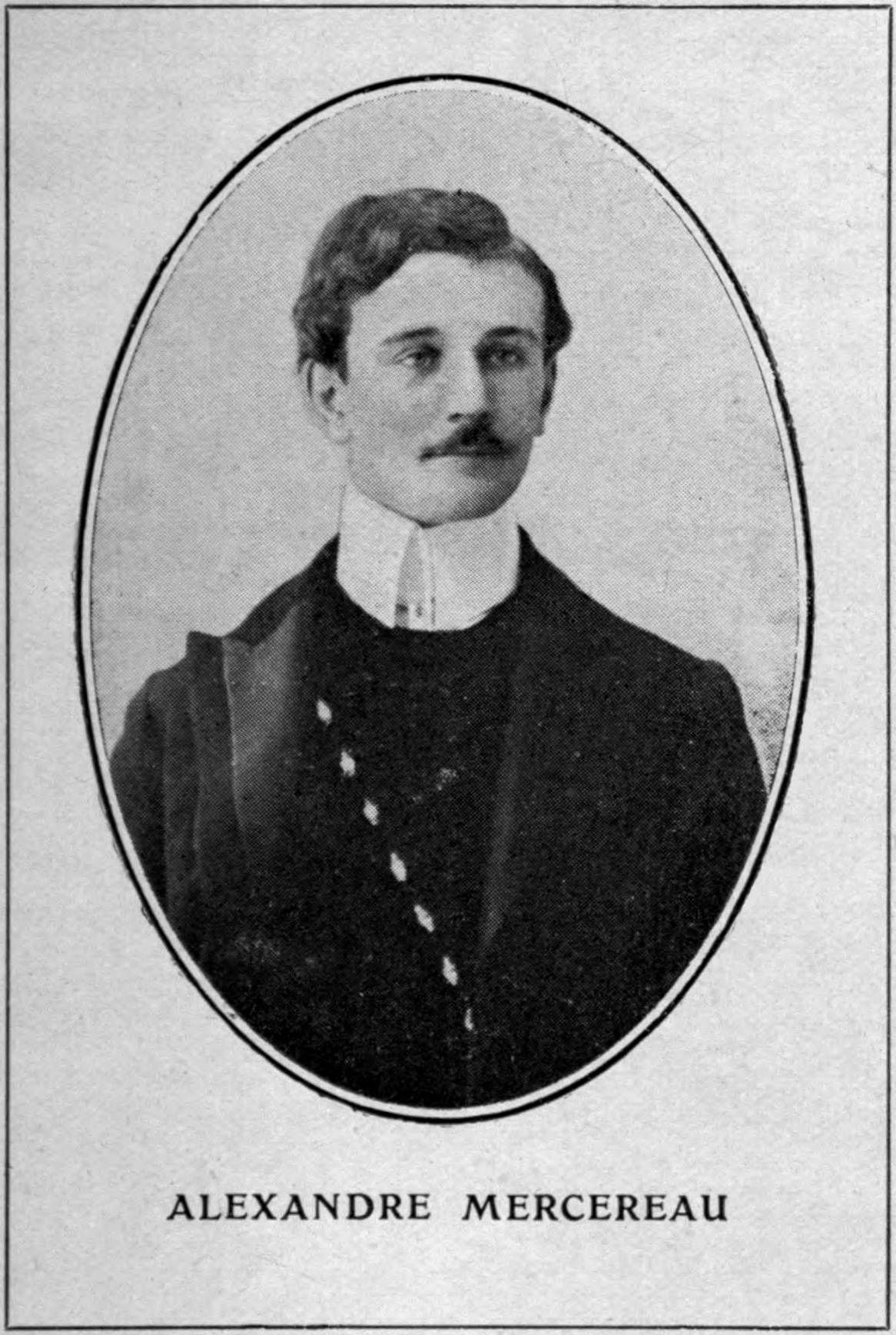
- Born: Alexandre Mercereau de la Chaume; 22 October 1884; Paris, France
- Died: 1945
- Occupation: Poet
- Writing career
- Movement: Symbolist poets

Alexandre Mercereau (22 October 1888 – 1945) was a French symbolist poet and critic associated with Unanimism and the Abbaye de Créteil. He founded the Villa Médicis Libre, which helped impoverished artists and operated as charitable reformatory for delinquent teenagers. Mercereau's work inspired the revolutionary artistic movement of the early 20th century known as Cubism.

== Early life and career ==
Born Alexandre Mercereau de la Chaume, he signed his first texts Eshmer-Valdor, a pseudonym he quickly abandoned. In 1901, at sixteen years of age, Mercereau's first verses were published; poetry and criticism in Oeuvre d'art international. In 1904 he co-founded the magazine La Vie, where he became assistant editor, drama critic, and columnist.

In 1905 he published Les Thuribulums affaissés, a book of verse that attracted much attention. At the same time, he co-founded the Association Ernest-Renan. In 1906 he organized the French section of Salon exhibition and literary review La Toison d'Or.

In 1907 he published Gens de là et d'ailleurs. From 1907 to 1908 he co-founded and participated in the experience of the Abbaye de Créteil, a collective open to artists. Mercereau organized exhibitions of French artists in Moscow, Saint-Petersburg, Kiev, and Odessa. After World War I he published a pamphlet, L'Abbaye et le bolchevisme culturel (published by Eugène Figuière), in which he denounced the attitude of Georges Duhamel and Charles Vildrac. From 1910 he co-directed with Paul Fort the Parisian literary review Vers et Prose. In 1911 he created the literary section of the Salon d'Automne in Paris, called Comité d'initiative théâtrale, consisting of public lectures by emerging authors at the Théâtre de l'Odéon. He subsequently co-founded the Revue indépendante and La Rue, in addition to Vers et Prose.

Mercereau was literary director at Jacques Povolozky & Cie publishing, director of Caméléon, a café littéraire in Montparnasse. In Histoire Contemporaine des Lettres Française de 1885 à 1914 (Eugène Figuière), Ernest Florian-Parmentier writes "... M. Mercereau seems endowed with all the qualities that lead almost inevitably to success.

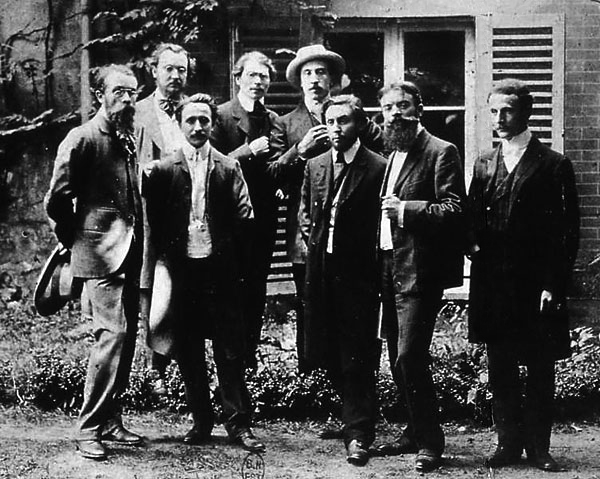
Abbaye de Créteil, ca.1908. First row: Charles Vildrac, René Arcos, Albert Gleizes, Barzun, Alexandre Mercereau. Second row: Georges Duhamel, Berthold Mahn, d'Otémar

== Abbaye de Créteil ==
The Abbaye de Créteil was a phalanstère utopian community founded during the fall of 1906 by Alexandre Mercereau, along with the poets René Arcos, Henri-Martin Barzun, Charles Vildrac, and the artist, theorist Albert Gleizes. The movement drew its inspiration from the Abbaye de Thélème, a fictional creation by Rabelais in his novel Gargantua.

Albert Gleizes met the artists Berthold Mahn, Jacques d'Otémar and Josué Gaboriaud while in Amiens (1904), as well as the printer, Lucien Linard, who would run the printshop at the Abbaye de Créteil. At this time, the art critic Jean Valmy Baysse (and soon historian of the Comédie-Française), in collaboration with Alexandre Mercereau, René Arcos, Charles Vildrac and Georges Duhamel were invited to participate on a new journal, titled La Vie.

Symbolist poet and writer Henri-Martin Barzun joined the group of writers and painters in 1905. Gleizes assisted in the formation of the Association Ernest Renan in December at the Théâtre Pigalle, in an attempt to counter the rise of militarist propaganda. In the process, publications and artwork tended towards a more popular and secular culture. Gleizes was in charge of the literary and artistic developments that organized poetry readings and street theatre.

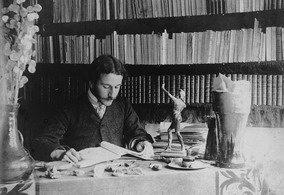
Alexandre Mercereau, circa 1906

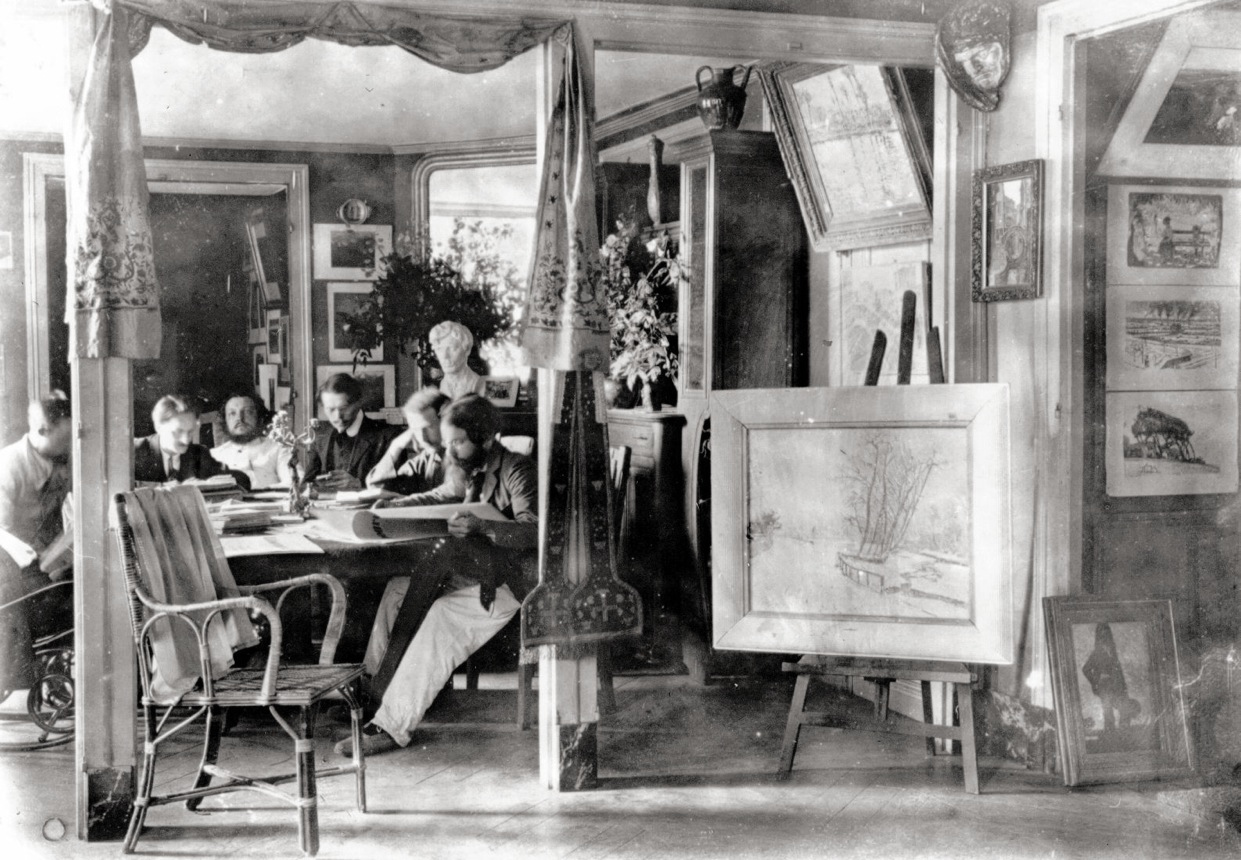
Abbaye de Créteil, interior scene, circa 1907

Mercereau, Gleizes and others throughout 1906 worked on a concept established by Charles Vildrac of creating a self-supporting community of artists. The motivation was to develop their art free of commercial considerations. In Créteil, a small village outside Paris, they invested a house and grounds. Barzun paid the rent for the first six months, financed with his small inheritance. Gleizes and Vildrac moved in during the month of December. At the outset of 1907 the Abbaye de Créteil consisted of Gleizes, Arcos and Vildrac with his wife Rose, sister of Duhamel. Duhamel and Barzun joined the group periodically. The musician Albert Doyen, later to become known as founder of the Fêtes du Peuple also participated intermittently. In 1906 Mercereau travelled to Moscow, where he met a group of Russian symbolist and Art Nouveau artists called Голубая роза (Blue Rose). There worked on a magazine publication and helped organize the French section of a salon exhibition called La Toison d'Or (Golden Fleece, Золотое руно). Simultaneously, he worked as a correspondent for the Abbaye de Créteil.

He returned to Paris in the Spring of 1907 with a Russian wife. At this time the Abbaye group supported itself through the printing (run by Linard and Gleizes) of high-quality material. The painters Berthold Mahn, Jacques d'Otémar and Henri Doucet visited periodically.

A former student at the Académie Julian and a friend of Maurice Denis and Les Nabis, Henri Le Fauconnier was painting in a progressively geometric fashion. He exhibited his seascapes at the 1909 Salon des Indépendants, and would soon meet Albert Gleizes through Alexandre Mercereau the same year. Mercereau, perhaps, realized the extent of their common interests.

== Villa Médicis Libre ==
Mercereau founded the Villa Médicis Libre, in Villepreux, under the patronage of Fondation Georges Bonjean, to provide inexpensive accommodations for avant-garde artists living in difficulties. André Lhote and Raoul Dufy resided there in 1910.

== Mercereau and Cubism ==
According to Albert Gleizes, Mercereau is responsible for having introduced him to Jean Metzinger, Robert Delaunay and Henri Le Fauconnier in 1910—the same year that Mercereau curated and included these artists in a Moscow exhibition, probably the first Jack of Diamonds Exhibition. Prior to meeting, Gleizes and Metzinger had been linked by Louis Vauxcelles' disparaging comments on "des cubes blafards" which likely referred to Metzinger's Portrait of Apollinaire (1909–10) and Gleizes' L'Arbre (The Tree) (1910) at the Salon des Indépendants. Mercereau had previously included Gleizes' Les Brumes du Matin sur la Marne in a Russian exhibition of 1908.

"Given Mercereau's long standing delight in promoting group activity", writes art historian Daniel Robbins, "it is easy to recognize his pleasure in having brought together three painters whose works exhibited similar interests and who could be identified with his own synthetic ideals, ideals which had been influential in the Abbaye's development". As organizer of the literary section of the Salon d'Automne of 1909, he was able to introduce Gleizes to painters exhibiting there and to introduce his own concepts to the world of painting.

In 1909 and 1910 a group of artists came together through Mercereau. The entire group—including Allard, Barzun, Beauduin, Castiaux, Jouve, Divoire, Marinetti, Brâncuși, Varlet and even Apollinaire and Salmon—became sympathetic to the ideas of the Abbaye. During the Summer of 1908 Gleizes and Mercereau organized a Journée portes ouvertes at the Abbaye, with poetry readings, music and exhibitions. Participants included the Italian Symbolist poet, and soon principle theorist of Futurism, Filippo Tommaso Marinetti, and the Romanian sculptor Constantin Brâncuși.

"In poetry", writes Robbins, "this post-symbolist attempt to achieve new forms had to break decisively with the old unities of time, place and action. Unity of scene did not correspond with the reality of modem life; unity of time did not correspond with the culturally known and anticipated effects of change. That is why Mercereau (as Metzinger noted) shifted his scenes so violently, why Barzun tried to solve the problem of simultaneously developing lines of action by choral chanting. Similarly Gleizes and his painter friends sought to create a vision free from introverted or obscure imagery which could treat collective and simultaneous factors. This necessitated a new kind of allegory opposed to the old meaning which presented one thing as the symbolic equivalent of another. A tentative precedent perhaps existed in Courbet's Real Allegory which, however, might have been considered an allegorical failure by Gleizes and Metzinger because Courbet "did not suspect that the visible world only became the real world by the operation of thought".

This group of artists met regularly at Le Fauconnier's studio near the Boulevard de Montparnasse. Salmon and Apollinaire were only peripheral members, participating in diverse literary and artistic circles, but Apollinaire's conception of Cubism was influenced by the epic notions found in the old Abbaye circle. In his preface to the 1911 Brussels Indépendants, Apollinaire wrote:

...thus has come a simple and noble art, expressive and measured, eager to discover beauty, and entirely ready to tackle those vast subjects which the painters of yesterday did not dare to undertake, abandoning them to the presumptuous, old-fashioned and boring daubers of the official Salons.

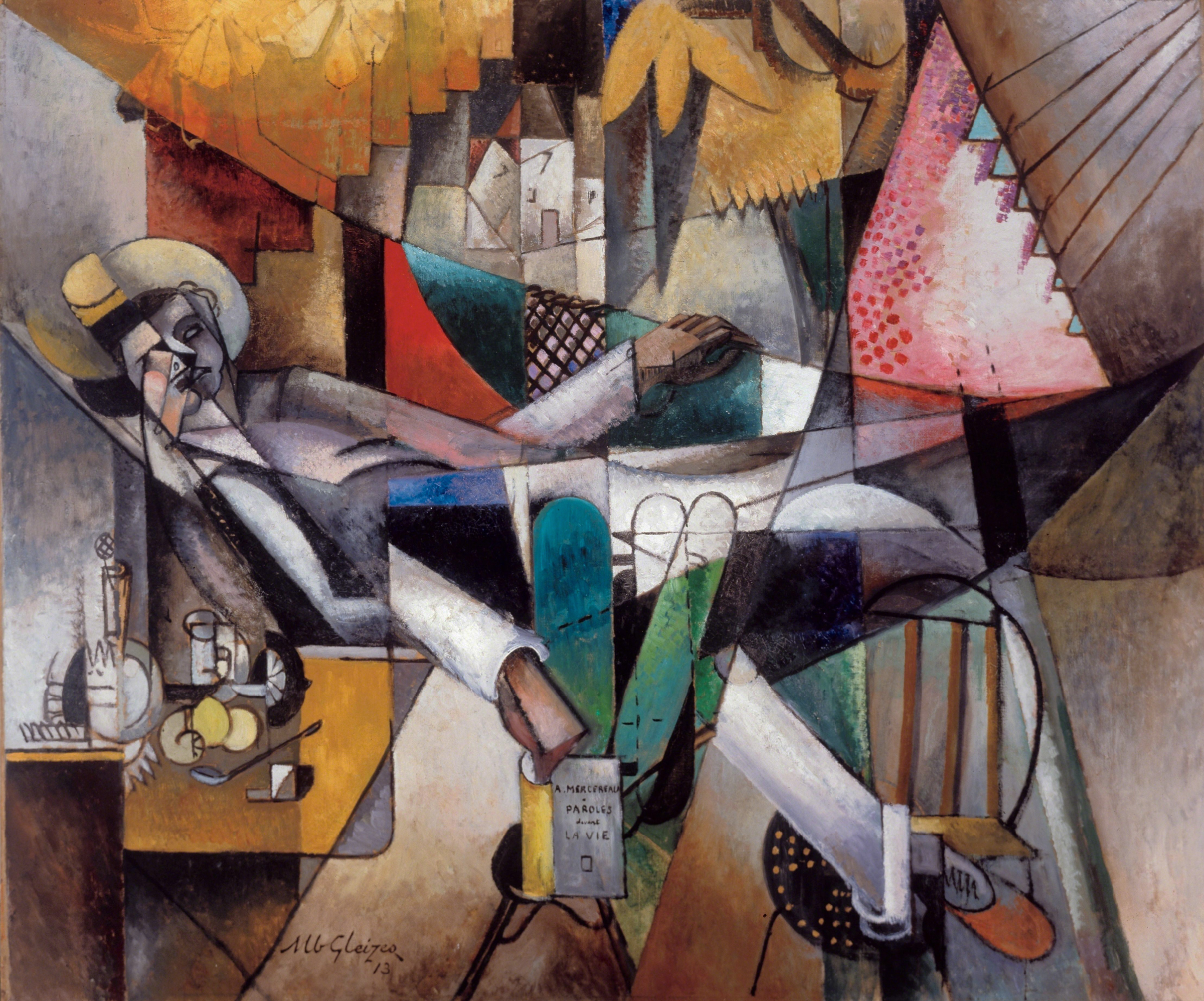
Albert Gleizes, 1913, L'Homme au Hamac (Man in a Hammock), oil on canvas, 130 x 155.5 cm, Albright-Knox Art Gallery, Buffalo, New York

This perspective differs from the studies of Picasso and Braque that became known years later as the analytical Cubism and approached subject matter almost entirely and confined it to exceedingly flat space. Instead, it suggests the broad concepts held by the Mercereau-Gleizes circle, concepts at that time visible only in the paintings of Albert Gleizes, Henri Le Fauconnier, Robert Delaunay and Fernand Léger.

Mercereau attempted to represent facets of time in his writings, much as Gleizes and Metzinger attempted to represent facets of space, time and form in their paintings.

Alexandre Mercereau, quick to spotlight the merit of others, so fastidious about honor that he indicates the provenance of any idea he did not find within himself, possessor of an intelligence where the most antinomic philosophies are elaborated, has very quickly passed through the phases of contemporary literature, with the cheerful self-assurance of someone who has never been affected by the herd instinct. ... Alexandre Mercereau glorifies the androgyne, establishes ingenuous relationships between sacred vessels and instruments for the boudoir, and remains expressly a poet.

— Jean Metzinger, 1911

A painting by Gleizes entitled Man in a Hammock includes one of Mercereau's books along with still-life elements next to the sitter, who has been interpreted as a possible self-portrait or a portrait of Metzinger. The book. Paroles devant la vie, was written by Mercereau in 1913. Gleizes collaborated in founding the Abbaye de Créteil and was very familiar with Mercereau's writings. Metzinger wrote an important text about Mercereau in 1911. Mercereau's publisher, Eugène Figuière, had published Du "Cubisme", the Cubist manifesto written by Gleizes and Metzinger a year earlier.

In 1914, Mercereau curated Moderní umění, 45th Exhibition of SVU Mánes in Prague. This "Survey of Modern Art" was one of the last prewar exhibitions in Prague. The exhibition included works by Alexander Archipenko, Georges Braque, Constantin Brâncuși, Robert Delaunay, André Derain, Marcel Duchamp, Raoul Dufy, Othon Friesz, Albert Gleizes, Roger de La Fresnaye, Louis Marcoussis, Jean Marchand, Jean Metzinger, Piet Mondrian, Diego Rivera, Edvard Munch, Max Pechstein, Pablo Picasso, Otto van Rees, Adya van Rees-Dutilh and Jacques Villon, in addition to Czech artists.

By 1914, Mercereau had met the Spanish sculptor Julio González and became his lifelong supporter and friend.

== Publications ==
- Les Thuribulums affaissés, poèmes, 1905
- Gens de là et d'ailleurs : gens de la terre, gens de la ville, gens de Paris, 1907
- Contes des ténèbres, 1911
- La Littérature et les idées nouvelles, 1912
- Paroles devant la vie : la vie, le poète, la fiancée, la femme enceinte, la mère, soi-même, la demeure, la mort, 1913
- La Paix armée et le problème d'Alsace dans l'opinion des nouvelles générations françaises, 1914
- Évangile de la bonne vie, 1919
- Séraphyma, 1922
- La Conque miraculeuse, 1922
- Les Pensées choisies d'Alexandre Mercereau, 1922
- Une histoire merveilleuse, 1928
