= Unanimism =

Unanimism (French: unanimisme) is a movement in French literature begun by Jules Romains in the early 1900s, with his first book, La vie unanime, published in 1904. It can be dated to a sudden conception Romains had in October 1903 of a 'communal spirit' or joint 'psychic life' in groups of people.

It is based on ideas of collective consciousness and collective emotion, and on crowd behavior, where members of a group do or think something simultaneously. Unanimism is about an artistic merger with these group phenomena, which transcend the consciousness of the individual. Harry Bergholz writes that "grossly generalizing, one might describe its aim as the art of the psychology of human groups". Because of this collective emphasis, common themes of unanimist writing include politics and friendship.

The primary unanimist work is Romains's multi-volume cycle of novels Les Hommes de bonne volonté (Men of Good Will), the ideas in which can be traced back to La vie unanime. The narrative jumps from character to character, rather than following one at a time, in an effort to reveal the nature and experience of the group as a whole.

Other writers sometimes called unanimistes—many associated with the Abbaye de Créteil—include Georges Chennevière, Henri-Martin Barzun, Alexandre Mercereau, Pierre Jean Jouve, Georges Duhamel, Luc Durtain, Charles Vildrac and René Arcos.
