= The Tree (Gleizes) =

Painting by Albert Gleizes

- L'Arbre (French)
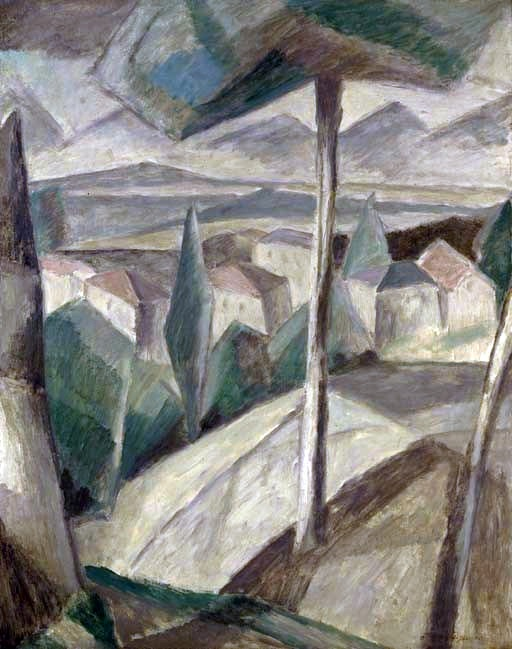
- Artist: Albert Gleizes
- Year: 1910
- Medium: Oil on canvas
- Dimensions: 92 cm × 73.2 cm (36.25 in × 28.6 in)
- Location: Private collection

The Tree (French: L'Arbre), is a painting created in 1910 by the French artist Albert Gleizes. Executed in an advanced Proto-Cubist style, the work was exhibited in Paris at the Salon des Indépendants, 1910 (no. 2160), the following year Gleizes chose to exhibit it at the Salon de la Section d'Or, Galerie La Boétie, 1912 (no. 34), and Manes Moderni Umeni, S.V.U., Vystava, Prague, 1914 (no. 33). The painting was again shown at the Grand Palais, Salon des Indépendants, Trente ans d'art indépendant, in 1926. L'Arbre, an important work of 1910, appeared at the decisive Salon des Indépendants of 1911, where Cubism emerged as a group manifestation and spread across the globe, at times shocking the general public.

== Description ==
The Tree is an oil painting on canvas with dimensions 92 by 73.2 cm (36 1/4 by 28 5/8 inches), signed and dated Albert Gleizes 10, lower right.

Gleizes practically subjugates The Tree in the foreground—its thin trunk slightly off-center and foliage cropped at the top—to a secondary role within a meticulously geometric World landscape. Here, the receding landscape marked by protruding hills and steep cliff-like formations, is perhaps more naturalistic than the core group of Gleizes' subsequent 1911–12 landscapes (e.g., Le Chemin (Paysage à Meudon), 1911, and Les Baigneuses (The Bathers), 1912) yet does not replicate any other known painting (or specific location) in any of its parts. This fact strongly points towards it being an invention born out of Gleizes' studio.

Gleizes' method was fundamentally synthetic. Although the landscape seems persuasively realistic (with its foreground, background and village in between), it is not an existing place somewhere between Paris and his studio at Courbevoie, consistent with Gleizes' method of bringing together various elements from different locations anteriorly observed in nature.

The superposition of hills with a succession of brown, grey and white planes throughout this painting—providing a sense of temporal duration and spatial extension to the immense vista—along with the cubic architectural structures cutting through the center of the canvas, each with its own perspective, are very typical of the core group of Gleizes' landscapes. The divers elements are combined in such a way that avoids symmetry; a characteristic found in several of the artists landscapes, painted before and after L'Arbre, each a unique creation.

Daniel Robbins writes of The Tree (L'Arbre) and related works in the catalogue of the Gleizes Retrospective at the Guggenheim, New York (1964):

In this work, one of Gleizes' most important paintings of the crucial year 1910, we see the artist's volumetric approach to Cubism and his successful union of a broad field of vision with a flat picture plane. Earlier studies, such as By the Seine (Bord de la Seine, Meudon) of 1909, and Road, Trees and Houses (Environs de Meudon) of 1910 (both in the collection of Walter Firpo), clearly anticipate this development.

During his trip to Bagnères sur Bigorre, Gascony, in 1909 Gleizes concentrated exclusively on landscapes, reducing natural forms to primary shapes. His effort to portray the complex rhythms of a panorama resulted in "a comprehensive geometry of intersecting and overlapping forms which created a new and more dynamic quality of movement".

His 1911 Paysage à Meudon followed, in which "Man is reintroduced, but subordinated to the heroic concept of landscape which simultaneously comprehends the close and the distant, the earth's curve, the sun, even the force of wind against trees". (Robbins, 1964)

== 1910 in brief ==
Gleizes writes in his Souvenirs of the crucial year 1910:

After painting a series of pictures, some of which are still in existence today, I was still dissatisfied and yet better prepared for experiments that would go deeper. It was in 1910 that, for the first time, I showed in the Salon des Indépendants and completely abandoned the salon of the Nationale, where there was nothing more for me to do. I sent to the Cours-la-Reine a full figure, a full sized portrait of the poet René Arcos, as well as two landscapes of the area around Paris, simple collections of masses in restrained colours. From that moment onwards, I can see it clearly now, my researches passed from the surface to the interior of the plastic problem. So 1910 brought another white stone to my life, as it would mark a stage which, if it was not conclusive, would at least be very positive. Above all in the second half of that year, when I painted the canvasses which would appear in the Salon des Indépendants of 1911.

Gleizes met Jean Metzinger and Robert Delaunay in 1910, through Alexandre Mercereau, but had only vague knowledge of the work they showed at the Salon des Indépendants that same year. Gleizes too had exhibited at the same salon. Most importantly, Gleizes had read an article which had struck him, written by Jean Metzinger for the young literary review, Pan, run by two young poets, [Marcel Rieu] and Jean Clary. The anti-Hellenic concept of representing a subject from multiple points of view was a central idea of Jean Metzinger's Note sur la Peinture article of 1910. It was at the Indépendants of 1910 that Metzinger showed a portrait of Guillaume Apollinaire which Apollinaire in his book The Cubist Painters, 1913, claimed was the first Cubist portrait. Gleizes continues writing in his Souvenirs:

1910 was the year in which, in its last months, a more or less coherent group began to form from certain tendencies which were quite clearly present in our generation but had previously been scattered. Painters saw what they had in common, poets joined them, feelings of sympathy were established, a general atmosphere began to form which would soon produce an action whose effects were to be quickly felt in the surrounding world. Painters and writers would support each other, moved as they all were by a single faith. (Albert Gleizes, Souvenirs)

== Exhibitions ==
- Salon des Indépendants, Paris, 1910, no. 2160
- Salon des Indépendants, Paris, 1911, not mentioned in the catalogue
- Salon de la Section d'Or, Paris, 1912, no. 34
- Moderni Umeni, S.V.U. Manes, Prague, 1914, no. 33
- Trente Ans d'Art Independant, Grand Palais, Paris, 1926
- Rene Gimpel Galerie, New York, 1937, no. 6
- Probably Lyon, Chapelle du Lycée Ampère, Albert Gleizes, 50 ans de peinture, November - December 1947 (illustrated in the catalogue)
- Albert Gleizes Retrospective, Passedoit Gallery, New York, 1949, no. 2
- Le Cubisme, Musée National d'Art Moderne, Paris, 1953, no. 35
- Depuis Bonnard, Musée National d'Art Moderne, Paris, 1960-61
- Von Bonnard bis Heute, Haus der Kunst, Munich, 1961
- The Solomon R. Guggenheim Museum, New York, Albert Gleizes, 1881-1953, A Retrospective Exhibition, 1964–65, no. 19. This exhibition traveled to Musée National d'Art Moderne, Paris (no. 7), and Museum am Ostwall, Dortmund (no. 7)

== Literature ==
- Jean Metzinger, Albert Gleizes, Du "Cubisme", 1912, Eugène Figuière Editeurs
- Albert Gleizes, 50 Ans, Lyon, 1947, p. 2.
- Gray, C. "Gleizes", Magazine of Art, October, 1950, p. 208.
- Habasque, G. Cubism, Geneva, 1959.
- P. Alibert, Albert Gleizes, naissance et avenir du cubisme, Saint-Etienne, 1982, p. 30 (illustrated). * A. Varichon, Albert Gleizes, Catalogue raisonné, vol. I, Paris, 1998, no. 345 (illustrated p. 127). * Exh. cat. Albert Gleizes - Le cubisme de majesté, Museu Picasso, Barcelona, 2001, p. 21 (illustrated). * D. Cottington, Cubism and its histories, Manchester, 2004, p. 59.
- A. Varichon, Albert Gleizes, Catalogue raisonné, vol. I, Paris, 1998, no. 345 (illustrated p. 127).
- Albert Gleizes - Le cubisme de majesté, Museu Picasso, Barcelona, 2001, p. 21 (illustrated).
- D. Cottington, Cubism and its histories, Manchester, 2004, p. 59.

== See also ==
- List of works by Albert Gleizes
