= Charles Vildrac =

French playwright (1882–1971)

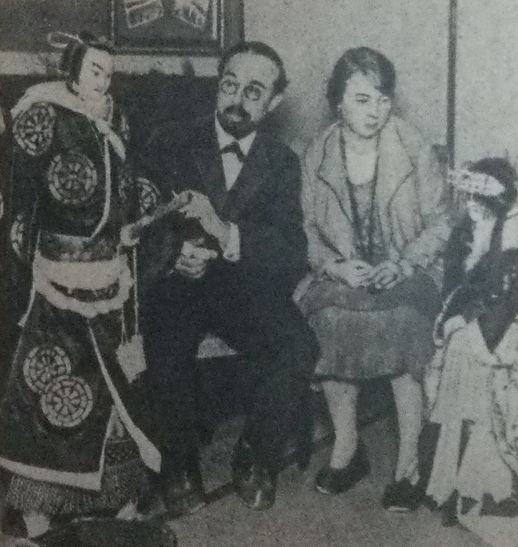
Charles Vildrac and his wife in 1926

Charles Vildrac (November 22, 1882 – June 25, 1971), born "Charles Messager", was a French libertarian playwright, poet and author of what some consider the first modern children's novel, L'Île rose (1924).

Born in Paris, Vildrac's first poems were written when he was a teenager in the 1890s. In 1901 he published Le Verlibrisme, a defense of traditional verse. In 1912 he published a collection of prose poems.

He was a member of the Abbaye de Créteil which he founded with Georges Duhamel. He died in Saint-Tropez.

The Prix de poésie Charles Vildrac is named for him.

== Works ==
- Poèmes (1905)
- Images et mirages (1907), poems
- Livre d'amour (1910), poems
- Notes sur la technique poétique (1910), Notes on Poetic Technique, with Georges Duhamel
- Chants du désespéré (1914–20) (1920), Songs of a Desperate Man, poems
- Découverte (1912), récit novel
- Chants du désespéré (1920), poems
- Le Paquebot Tenacity (1920; lit. S.S. Tenacity), theatre play
- L'Indigent (1920), theatre play
- Michel Auclair (1921)
- L'Île rose (1924), children's novel, lit. The Pink Island, translated as Rose Island
- Poèmes de l'Abbaye (1925), poems
- Madame Béliard (1925), theatre play
- Prolongement (1927), poems
- D’un voyage au Japon (1927), travel story
- La Brouille (1930), The Misunderstanding, theatre play
- La Colonie (1930), children's novel (sequel to L'Île rose)
- Les Lunettes du lion (1932), children's tale
- La famille Moineau (1932), children's tale
- Le Jardinier de Samos (1932), theatre play
- Milot (1933), children's tale
- Bridinette (1935), children's tale
- Poucette (1936), theatre play
- L'œuvre peinte d'Eugène Dabit (1937), monographie
- Russie neuve (1938), travel story
- L'Air du temps (1938), theatre play
- Trois mois de prison (1942)
- L'Honneur des poètes (1943), volume of poems published by the French Resistance; Vildrac's contribution appears under the pseudonym Robert Barade
- Lazare (1945), in Chroniques de Minuit, Les Éditions de Minuit, p. 15-39
- Les Pères ennemis (1946), The Enemy Fathers, theatre play
- D'après l'écho (1949)
- Amadou le Bouquillon (1951), children's tale
- Les Jouets du Père Noël (1952), The Toys of Father Christmas
- Pages de journal (1968)

== Notes and references ==
- France, Peter (Ed.) (1995). The New Oxford Companion to Literature in French. Oxford: Clarendon Press. ISBN 0-19-866125-8.
