= Daniel Robbins (art historian) =

American art historian (1932–1995)

- Born: January 15, 1932; Brooklyn New York
- Died: January 14, 1995 (aged 62); Lebanon, New Hampshire
- Known for: Art history, Modernism, Exhibition curation
- Movement: Cubism, Modernism

Daniel J. Robbins (pseudonyms, Jeremiah Drummer and George Gregory Dobbs; January 15, 1932 – January 14, 1995) was an American art historian, art critic, and curator, who specialized in avant-garde 20th-century art and helped encourage the study of it. Robbins' area of scholarship was on the theoretical and philosophical origins of Cubism. His writings centered on the importance of artists such as Albert Gleizes, Jean Metzinger, Henri Le Fauconnier and Jacques Villon. He was a specialist in early Modernism, writing on Salon Cubists (the Section d'Or group) and championed contemporaries such as Louise Bourgeois and the Color Field painters. Art historian Peter Brooke referred to Robbins as "the great pioneer of the broader history of Cubism".

== Biography ==
=== Education and career ===
Daniel Robbins attended the University of Chicago as an undergraduate, receiving an A.B. in 1951 at age 19. He then attended Yale University receiving an M.A. in Art History in 1955. He had initially applied at Yale to study painting, but switched to art history when he realized the painting department was overshadowed by the painter Josef Albers.

After graduating from Yale in 1955 he taught at Indiana University for one academic year (1955–1956). He then began doctoral work at New York University Institute of Fine Arts. In 1958, at the instigation of his professor Robert Goldwater, Robbins began writing a PhD dissertation on the Cubist artist and theoretician Albert Gleizes. At the time when, writes art historian David Cottington, "the expansionary momentum both of the New York art market and of post-war art-historical scholarship in the USA were creating a favorable climate for the recovery of salon cubism." The year before, a section of Gleizes' memoirs were published, offering insight into the artistic milieu of pre-1914 Paris. One of the most characteristic features of the Salon Cubists who exhibited in the public salons (e.g., Salon d'Automne and Salon des Indépendants), unlike Picasso and Braque, was that they often worked on a large scale, and they had an interest in large "epic" subjects. Daniel Robbins had coined the term Epic Cubism to distinguish their work from the more intimate painting of Picasso and Braque.

Robbins completed his course work for the degree in 1958 in the joint Certificate of Museology program under A. Hyatt Mayor at the Metropolitan Museum of Art.

Robbins continued to paint, exhibiting under the pseudonym Jeremiah Drummer, and wrote art criticism for the Village Voice under the name of George Gregory Dobbs.

Following a stay in Paris as a Fulbright scholar at the University of Paris in 1958, Robbins became research assistant to the Chief Curator of the National Gallery of Art in Washington, D.C., in 1959, a position he would hold through 1961.

Daniel Robbins, Albert Gleizes, 1881–1953, a Retrospective Exhibition, Solomon R Guggenheim Museum, 1964. Published by The Solomon R. Guggenheim Foundation, New York, in collaboration with Musée National d'Art Moderne, Paris; Museum am Ostwall, Dortmund.

Robbins moved to New York City in 1961 and worked as a curator at the Solomon R. Guggenheim Museum. There he curated Albert Gleizes, 1881–1953: a Retrospective Exhibition and wrote a seminal text on the artist for the exhibition catalogue. He left the Guggenheim to become Director of the Rhode Island School of Design Museum from 1965 to 1971. As director of The RISD Museum he curated shows of new art, notably one called Raid the Icebox, for which Andy Warhol participated in choosing works from the museum's collection. At RISD, Robbins made exhibiting and collecting contemporary art a priority, something the Museum had not done for six decades.

He then became director of the Fogg Museum at Harvard University. At Harvard he continued to champion modern art, including leading the restoration of the Mark Rothko murals in the penthouse of Harvard University's Holyoke Center. In the fall of 1972 he conducted a seminar on Jacques Villon, and collaborated with the students to organize the first major Villon retrospective held in the U.S. (at the Fogg Museum) from 17 January to 29 February 1976.

After resigning from the directorship of the museum in 1974 he lectured in Fine art at Harvard, completed his dissertation (delayed due to professional demands and responsibilities), and in 1975 received his degree from New York University.

Robbins held a professorship at Dartmouth College from 1975 to 1980 and became a Senior Fellow at the National Endowment for the Humanities (1976). He lectured at a variety of institutions including Yale University (1977), Williams College (1978–79), Hunter College (1984), the Institute for Advanced Study in Princeton, New Jersey, and the University of Iowa (1985), where he co-authored a catalogue created for an exhibition of works by Cubist artist Jean Metzinger.

In 1980 Robbins accepted a permanent position as the Baker Professor of the Arts at Union College, where he directed a catalogue raisonné on Albert Gleizes.

=== The history of Cubism ===
Robbins had not contented himself to merely enrich the historical account of the beginnings of Cubism, as might have art historians John Golding (1929–2012) and Robert Rosenblum (1927–2006). He "challenged its very scope", writes David Cottington. In his PhD on Albert Gleizes, with access to the Gleizes published memoirs and unpublished papers, and following from personal interviews with the artists widow, Juliette Roche Gleizes, Robbins began to reveal an account of Cubism that pointed towards other influences within the burgeoning movement than those generally accepted. He boldly charged 'an historical tradition which regards the Demoiselles as the origin of cubism' to be unhistorical. As pointed out by Cottington, Robbins "insisted on both a distinct set of interests, and a separate artistic genealogy, for the group of artists within which Gleizes' work and ideas developed".

The lack of history consisted in the reductivism and exclusivism of a view that, placing Picasso's picture at the beginning of cubism's formal development, under-acknowledged or ignored the symbolists' interest in geometry, the particular structure and subject matter of neo-impressionism paintings and the parallel concerns of writers and social thinkers, and misread the relation of Braque's fauvism to his subsequent work. (Cottington, 219)

The distinct interests of the artists of Gleizes's circle, writes Cottington, "were registered by the commonalities of subject matter that Robbins identified in their paintings".

These involved the interaction of vast space with speed and action, with simultaneous work, commerce, sport and flight; with the modern city and the ancient country, with the river, the harbor and the bridge and above all, with time, for the sense of time—involving memory, tradition, and accumulated cultural thought—created the reality of the world. (Robbins, 1964)

Robbins argued that such iconography partially explained why there was no period in the work of Gleizes, Robert Delaunay, Fernand Léger or Henri Le Fauconnier closely corresponding to the analytic cubism of Picasso or Braque. It explained too, as Cottington points out, the move by Gleizes and Delaunay into abstraction, "and their sympathy with the theoretical motions of artists such as Kandinsky and Mondrian". The parallel genealogy Robbins extracted from Gleizes's memoirs was the inspiration generated through post-symbolist literary activity around Alexandre Mercereau, Paul Fort's Parisian review Vers et Prose and the Abbaye de Créteil. The 1964 Guggenheim essay on Gleizes developed these notions that Robbins summarized as:

A synthetic view of the universe, presenting the remarkable phenomena of time and space, multiplicity and diversity, at once was his painted equivalent to the ideals which were verbally realized in the Abbaye poetry. (Robbins, 1964)

Daniel Robbins, Joann Moser, Jean Metzinger in Retrospect, University of Iowa Museum of Art, Iowa City, 1985 (catalogue cover)

Capitalizing on the occasion presented by the first major retrospective of a prominent salon cubist, Robbins' Guggenheim essay greatly opened the field of Cubist studies to novel approaches, and, writes Cottington, his example was invaluable for a rising generation of historians of modernism.

Notwithstanding, the impact of Robbins radical conclusions remained somewhat overshadowed by the work of other mainstream art historians, such as Douglas Cooper, whose Cubist Epoch exhibition and 1970 publication gained in both impact and authority. During the 1980s however, Robbins began a major essay for a retrospective of the work of another key salon cubist: Jean Metzinger. This gave him the opportunity to take his thesis beyond the broad generalizations of the Guggenheim text. This text titled Metzinger, At the Center of Cubism, placed Metzinger at the intersection between the gallery cubists and the salon cubists. In a 1910 publication Note sur la peinture Metzinger explicitly relates, for the first time, the interest in representing objects as remembered from successive and subjective experiences within the context of both space and time. Metzinger's Note sur la peinture not only highlighted the works of Picasso and Braque, on the one hand, Le Fauconnier and Delaunay on the other, but it was also a tactical selection that highlighted the fact that only Metzinger himself was positioned to write about all four. Metzinger, uniquely, had been closely acquainted with the gallery cubists and the burgeoning salon cubists simultaneously. Robbins focused on the question of Picasso and Braque's influence, if any, on the work of Gleizes, Metzinger, Le Fauconnier and Delaunay; the group first named as Cubists in 1911.

Robbins died on January 14, 1995, at the Dartmouth–Hitchcock Medical Center in Lebanon, New Hampshire, shortly before his sixty-third birthday. He was 62 and lived in Troy, New York, and Braintree, Vermont. His death was caused by cancer.

== Selected publications ==
- Cézanne and structure in modern painting, Solomon R. Guggenheim Foundation, 1963, ASIN: B0007EMAQQ
- Contemporary Wall Sculpture, American Federation of Arts, 1963, ASIN: B003X626UA
- Albert Gleizes, 1881–1953, a Retrospective Exhibition, Solomon R Guggenheim Museum, 1964, Published by The Solomon R. Guggenheim Foundation, New York, in collaboration with Musée National d'Art Moderne, Paris; Museum am Ostwall, Dortmund.
- The Genealogy of the Section d'Or, in Albert Gleizes and the Section D'Or. Exhibition 28 October – 5 December 1964; Leonard Hutton Galleries, New York, William A. Camfield, Daniel Robbins, Leonard Hutton Galleries (New York, NY), 1964
- Jean Xceron, Guggenheim Museum, 1965, ASIN: B000F5NJNU
- Painting between the wars, 1918–1940, McGraw-Hill, 1966, ASIN: B007T4Q072
- Fernando Botero, Galerie Buchholz, 1966
- Gilbert Stuart: Portraitist of the Young Republic, 1755–1828, National Gallery of Art, John Walker, Daniel Robbins, Edgar Preston Richardson, Rhode Island School of Design. Museum of Art, 1967
- Early Portraits in Rhode Island, 1700–1850: An Exhibition to Honor the Seventy-Fifth Anniversary of The National Society of the Colonial Dames of America in the State of Rhode Island and Providence Plantations, Museum of Art, Rhode Island School of Design; 1ST edition, 1967, ASIN: B001A7WW3K
- Venice in the Eighteenth Century: Prints and Drawings, Rhode Island School of Design, 1967, ASIN: B0040Y0H6O
- The Neuberger Collection-an American Collection: Paintings, Drawings, and Sculpture, Rhode Island School of Design; Smithsonian Institution, 1968, ASIN: B0013GHXTQ
- The Neuberger Collection – An American Collection: Paintings, Drawings, And Sculpture, Harry N. Abrams, Inc., New York, 1968, ASIN: B001KS26W6
- Visions and Revisions, Catalogue: Museum of Art, Rhode Island School of Design, Providence, October 18–November 24, 1968, Rhode Island School of Design, 1968, ASIN: B00HG1U0IS
- The George Waterman Collection: Exhibition, October 22–November 23, 1969, Daniel Robbins, George Waterman, Museum of Art, Rhode Island School of Design, 1969, ASIN: B0012HPQFY
- Late Works John Robinson Frazier Museum of Art, 1969, ASIN: B002H3GGJC
- John Robinson Frazier; The Late Works, Rhode Island School of Design, 1969, ASIN: B000PSYF4E
- Beyond Minimalism, George Waterman Collection, Rhode Island School of Design, Museum of Art, Oct 1, 1969
- Raid the Icebox 1, with Andy Warhol: An Exhibition Selected from the Storage Vaults of the Museum of Art, Rhode Island School of Design, Fwd.; Daniel Robbins, David Bourdon, Andy Warhol, Contribs., Dominique De Menil, Rhode Island School of Design Museum of Art, 1969, ASIN: B000GY5RPS
- Joaquin Torres-Garcia, 1874–1949, Museum of Art, June 1970, ISBN 0911517235, ISBN 978-0911517231
- Jacques Callot 1592–1635, Daniel Robbins, Juergen Schulz, Department of Art, Brown University, 1970, ASIN: B007KIZX70
- The World Between the Ox and the Swine: Dada Drawings by Hans Richter, Volume 57, Issues 3–4 of Bulletin of Rhode Island School of Design, 1971
- New American Graphic Art: Exhibition September 12–October 28, Harvard University, Cambridge, Mass, Colles Baxter, Daniel Robbins, Fogg Art Museum, Harvard University, 1973
- The Formation and Maturity of Albert Gleizes: A Biographical and Critical Study; 1881 Through 1920, Ph.D. diss. New York University, 1975
- Jaques Villon, 1976, Cambridge, MA: Fogg Art Museum, Harvard University, First Edition, 1976, ASIN: B009Z329 km
- Folk Sculpture USA: [Exhibition ... the Brooklyn Museum, March 6–May 31, 1976, Los Angeles County Museum of Art, July 4–August 29, 1976], Universe Books, May 1976, ISBN 0876632274, ISBN 978-0876632277
- André Lhote, 1885–1962: Cubism, [exhibition] October 16 Through December 18, 1976, Leonard Hutton Galleries, 1976
- Jacques Villon, Sixty Drawings and Watercolors 1894–1954, Lucien Goldschmidt Inc. New York, 1979
- The Vermont State House: A history & guide, Vermont State House Preservation Committee, 1980, ASIN: B0006E1W16
- Picasso's Vollard suite: from the collection of Dartmouth College Museum & Galleries, Hanover, New Hampshire, Issue 2, Dartmouth College. Museum & Galleries, Daniel Robbins, Trustees of the Dartmouth College, 1980
- Henri de Toulouse-Lautrec: A selection of works from the Art Institute of Chicago, Medaenas monographs on the arts, Pennsylvania State University, Art Institute of Chicago, 1980, ASIN: B0006YXHEG
- Medaenas Toulouse-Lautrec, The Art of Oral Contraception, A Selection of Works from The Art Institute of Chicago, 1980, Daniel Robbins, Eugenia S. Robbins
- Préface, in Du "Cubisme", by Jean Metzinger and Albert Gleizes, 1912, 9–16, Sisteron: Edition Présence, 1980
- Sources of Cubism and Futurism, Art Journal, Vol. 41, No. 4, (Winter 1981): pp. 324–27, Published by College Art Association
- Edward Koren, prints and drawings, 1959–1981, Volume 1982, Part 1, Art Gallery, University of California, University Art Gallery, State University of New York at Albany, 1982
- Cubist drawings, 1907–1929. Exhibition at the Janie C. Gallery; November 1982–January 1983, by Daniel Robbins, Margit Rowell, The Gallery, 1983, ASIN: B0006EDZQQ
- Jean Metzinger: At the Center of Cubism, in Jean Metzinger in Retrospect, Joann Moser, Daniel Robbins, University of Iowa Museum of Art, Iowa City, J. Paul Getty Trust, University of Washington Press, December 1985, ISBN 0874140382, ISBN 978-0874140385
- Walter Murch, paintings and drawings, Judy Collischan, Paul Cummings, Daniel Robbins, Whitney Museum of American Art at Philip Morris, Hillwood Art Gallery, Long Island University, Jun 1, 1986
- An Abbreviated Historiography of Cubism. Art Journal 47, Winter 1988, 277–83
- Cubism: Le Fauconnier, Gleizes, Kupka, Marcoussis, Metzinger ... [et Al.]: February 10 to March 11, 1989, James Goodman Gallery, The Gallery, 1989
- The Complete Graphic Legacy of Fernand Leger: The Edith C. Blum Art Institute, Milton and Sally Avery Center for the Arts, Bard College, Annandale-on-Hudson, New York : September 3–November 19, 1989
- Henri le Fauconnier (1881–1946) A Pioneer Cubist, Daniel Robbins, Salander-O'Reilly Galleries, 1990, ASIN: B00A8ODL8G
- Larry Poons, Paintings 1963–1990, Daniel Robbins, John Zinsser, Salander-O'Reilly Galleries, Inc.; First Edition, 1990, ASIN: B000I5M8MA
- Die Entstehung des Kubismus: eine Neubewertung. Frankfurt: R. G. Fischer, 1990
- Henri Le Fauconnier's Mountaineers Attacked by Bears, Rhode Island School of Design: Museum Notes, 1996, 24–53
- Albert Gleizes: Période impressionniste avant 1907, Somogy, 1998
- Albert Gleizes: catalogue raisonné. 1898–1927, Volume 1, Fondation Albert Gleizes, Daniel Robbins, Pierre Georgel, Anne Varichon, Somogy, 1998
- Albert Gleizes: Abstraction création 1928–1933, Somogy, 1998
- The Drawings of John Butler Yeats, 1839–1922, Fintan Cullen, William Michael Murphy, Daniel Robbins, Albany Institute of History and Art, March 2003, ISBN 0939072076, ASIN: B007K5AW5G
