= Abbaye de Créteil =

Community in France

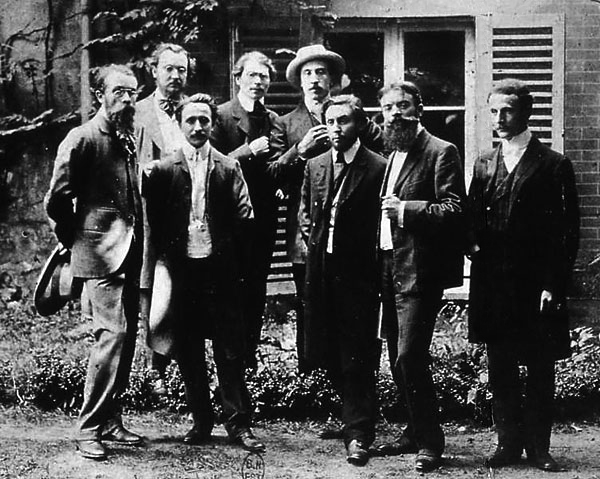
L'Abbaye de Créteil, ca.1908. First row: Charles Vildrac, René Arcos, Albert Gleizes, Barzun, Alexandre Mercereau. Second row: Georges Duhamel, Berthold Mahn, d'Otémar

L'Abbaye de Créteil or Abbaye group (French: Le Groupe de l'Abbaye) was a utopian artistic and literary community founded during the month of October, 1906. It was named after the Créteil Abbey, as most gatherings took place in that suburb of Paris.

== History ==
In 1905 and early 1906 a group of young artists and poets holding meetings at various locations found that society, the way it was organized, did not take into consideration an environment needed for creative expression, nor the goals it proposed. Founded officially in the autumn of 1906 by the painter Albert Gleizes, and the poets René Arcos, Henri-Martin Barzun, Alexandre Mercereau and Charles Vildrac, L'Abbaye de Créteil was a phalanstère, a utopian community. The movement drew its inspiration from the Abbaye de Thélème, a fictional creation by Rabelais in his novel Gargantua. It was closed down by its members early in 1908.

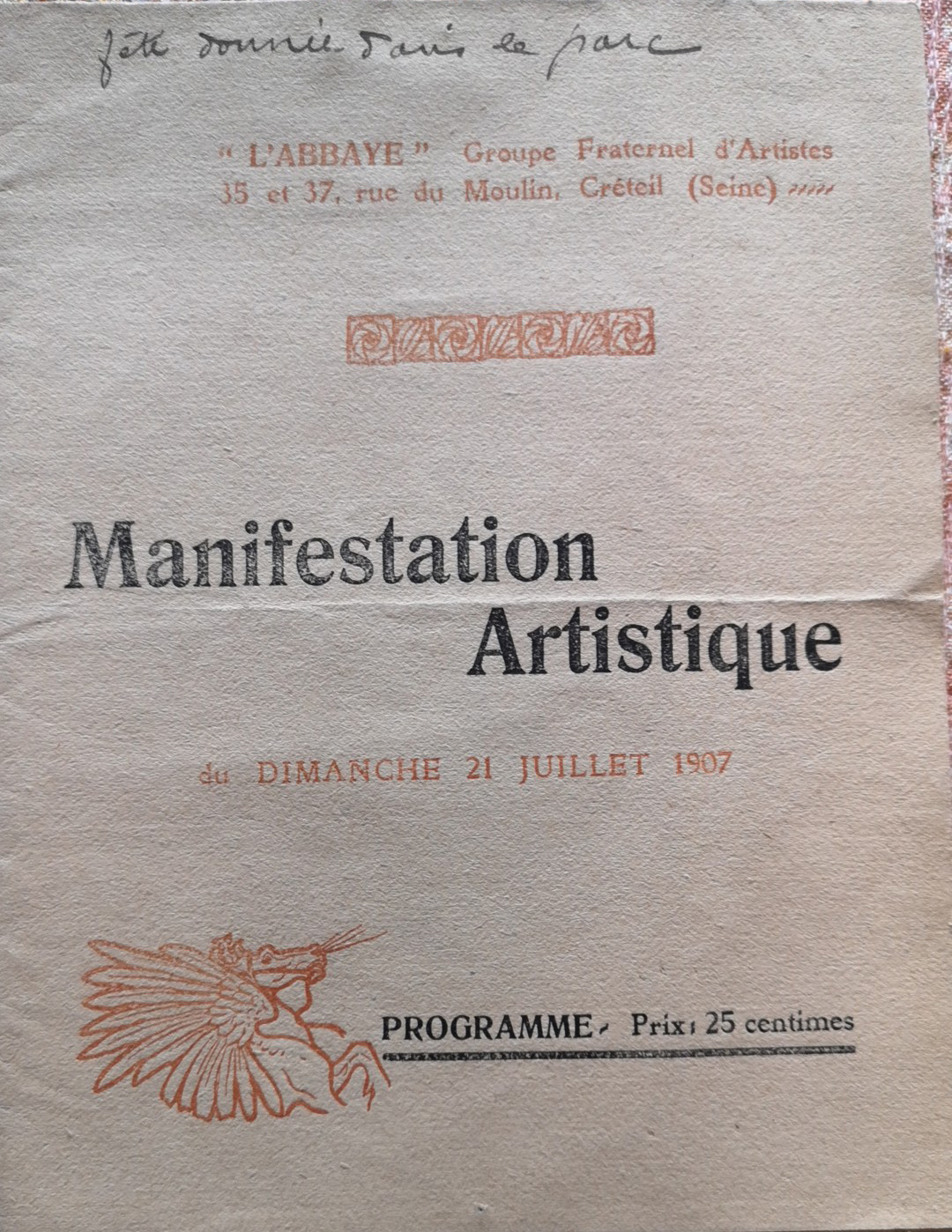
Cover of the program for the 1st exhibition of l'Abbaye de Créteil, 21 July 1907

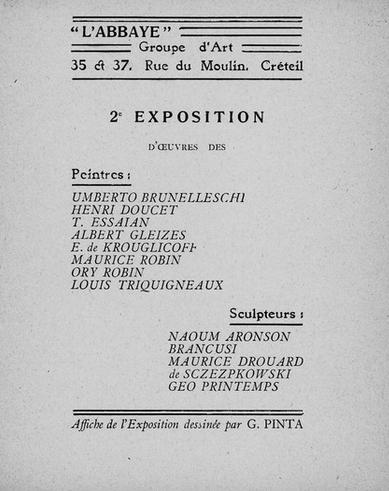
Invitation for the 2nd exhibition of l'Abbaye as an art collective at rue du Moulin, Créteil, around 1907-08

Georges Duhamel and Vildrac settled in Créteil, just to the southeast of Paris, in a house in a park-like setting along the river Marne. Their aim was to establish a place of freedom and friendship favourable for artistic and literary creativity.

Henri-Martin Barzun (father of the historian and cultural critic Jacques Barzun) was a financial contributor to his friends at the Abbaye de Créteil.

In an unpublished part of his Souvenirs Gleizes wrote that an initial idea for the Abbaye of Créteil was to escape from corrupt Western civilization to the simplicity of life in the South Seas, as he then believed Gauguin had done. (Robbins, 1964)

The group tried to create a publishing house that would bring in sufficient income to support the Abbaye. The typographer Lucien Linard, a friend of Albert Gleizes, furnished the printing press. From January 1907 through January 1908, some twenty books were published by the Abbaye. Barzun, more sophisticated than the other idealists of the Abbaye, introduced Gleizes to the specific history of Utopian socialism. Though Gleizes did not enter the Abbaye with a specific program in mind. The art historian Daniel Robbins is responsible for laying out the filiation between the Paul Fort's Vers et Prose, the Abbaye, post-Symbolist writers and politically engaged aesthetic thinking that would lead Gleizes to Cubism. Robbin's pioneering work brought the history of the Abbaye to an Anglo-American readership. He characterized their endeavors as a 'search for a synthetic modern art' that gave expression to social ideas. In his 1964 Guggenheim essay on Gleizes, Robbins developed these notions and summarized them as:

A synthetic view of the universe, presenting the remarkable phenomena of time and space, multiplicity and diversity, at once was his painted equivalent to the ideals which were verbally realized in the Abbaye poetry. (Robbins, 1964)

Many artists visited the community and participated in its project, including the poet Pierre Jean Jouve; the musician Albert Doyen; the illustrator Berthold Mahn; the painter Henri Doucet; Léon Bazalgette, who had translated American poet Walt Whitman's Leaves of Grass into French; and the writer Jules Romains, founder of unanimism.

The fame of the Abbaye circulated even in Moscow, attracting many artists along the way. Filippo Tommaso Marinetti and Constantin Brâncuși were visitors there and young writers like Roger Allard (one of the first to defend Cubism), Pierre Jean Jouve, and Paul Castiaux are some of the artists who wanted to publish their works through the Abbaye.

The Abbaye group, in principle supporting themselves through the communal work of publishing, were supported by many Symbolists. Yet its members soon began to break with the art forms practiced by the respected older generation. Like many Symbolists, the Abbaye artists "scorned the structure of a bourgeois world and sought to substitute a communal society", writes Robbins, "but they did not reject the themes of modern life in favor of the Symbolist focus on single elements and internal, individual images".

They wished instead "to create an epic and heroic art, stripped of ornament and obscure allegory", Robbins continues, "an art dealing with the relevant subjects of modern life: crowds, man and machines, even, ultimately, the city itself". The intentions of the Abbaye were vast and would ultimately remain unfulfilled. Their goal, like that of the Symbolists before them, was equivalent to an escape from reality. "Yet there were important distinctions", writes Robbins, "for the Abbaye intention to create a total future a priori ruled out the Symbolist technique of creating solely from an aesthetic or a closed ideal".

The Abbaye attracted much interest but little revenue and its young members found themselves forced to close their beloved Abbaye on January 28, 1908. Its publishing house survived for a while and the friends continued to gather every month for a dîner des copains (in French, "dinner of pals").

Shortly after its dissolution, Gleizes moved to 7 rue du Delta near Montmartre, Paris, with artists Henri Doucet, Amedeo Modigliani, Maurice Drouart and Geo Printemps.

== Photographs circa 1907 ==
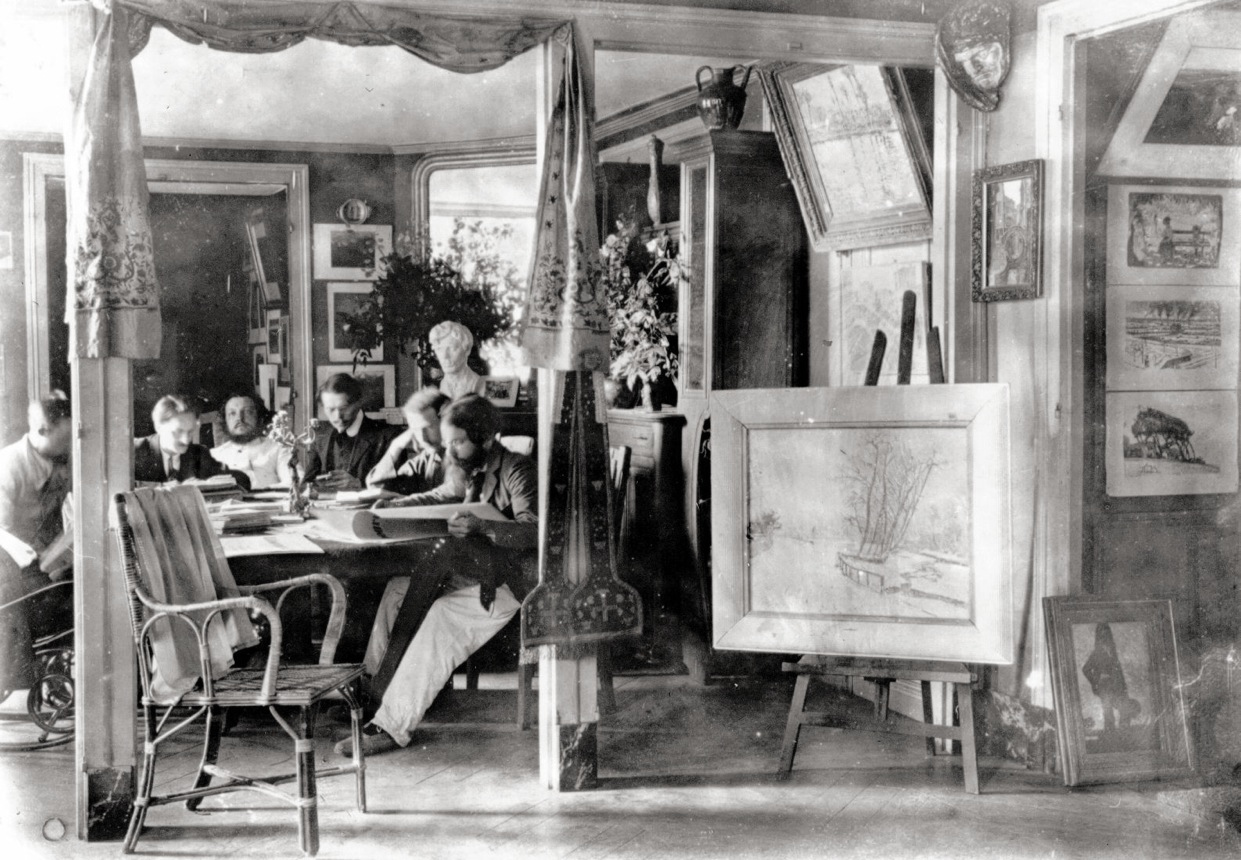
Abbaye de Créteil, interior scene

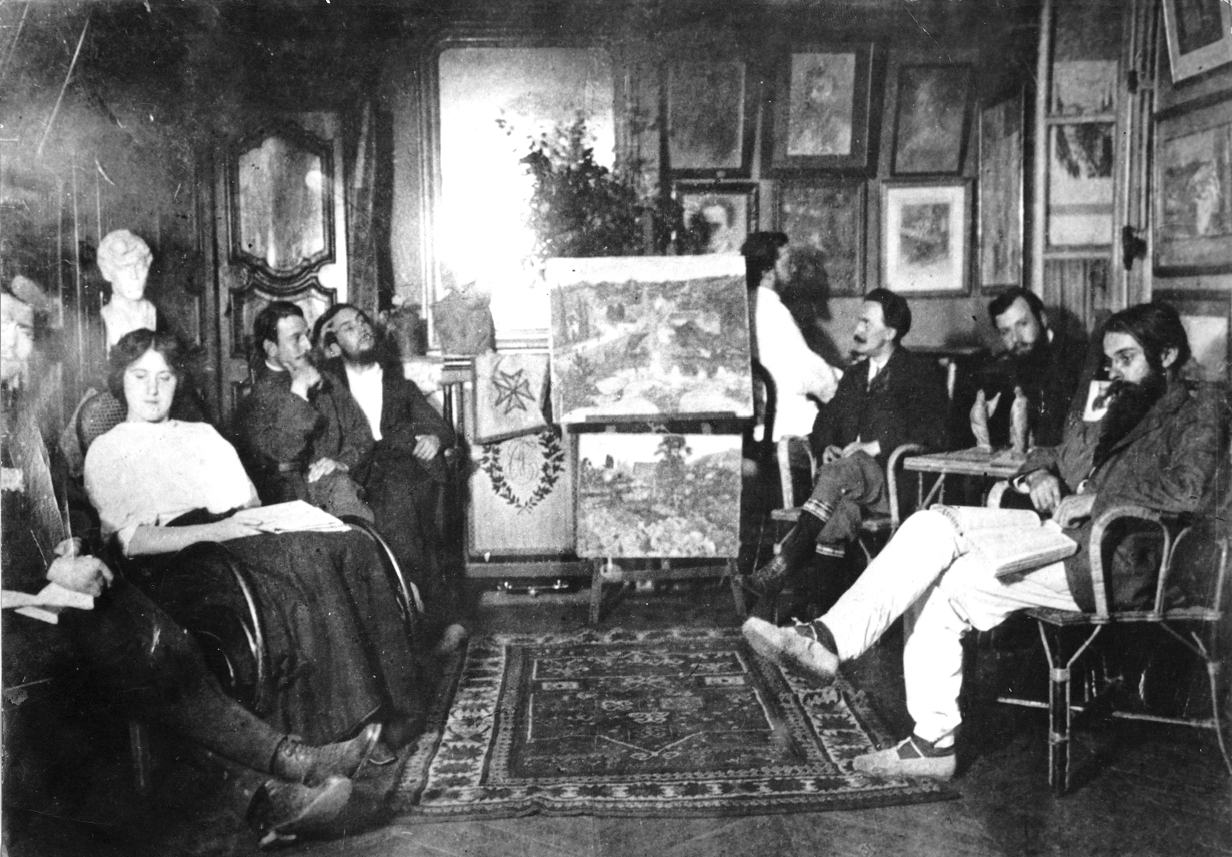
Abbaye de Créteil, interior group scene

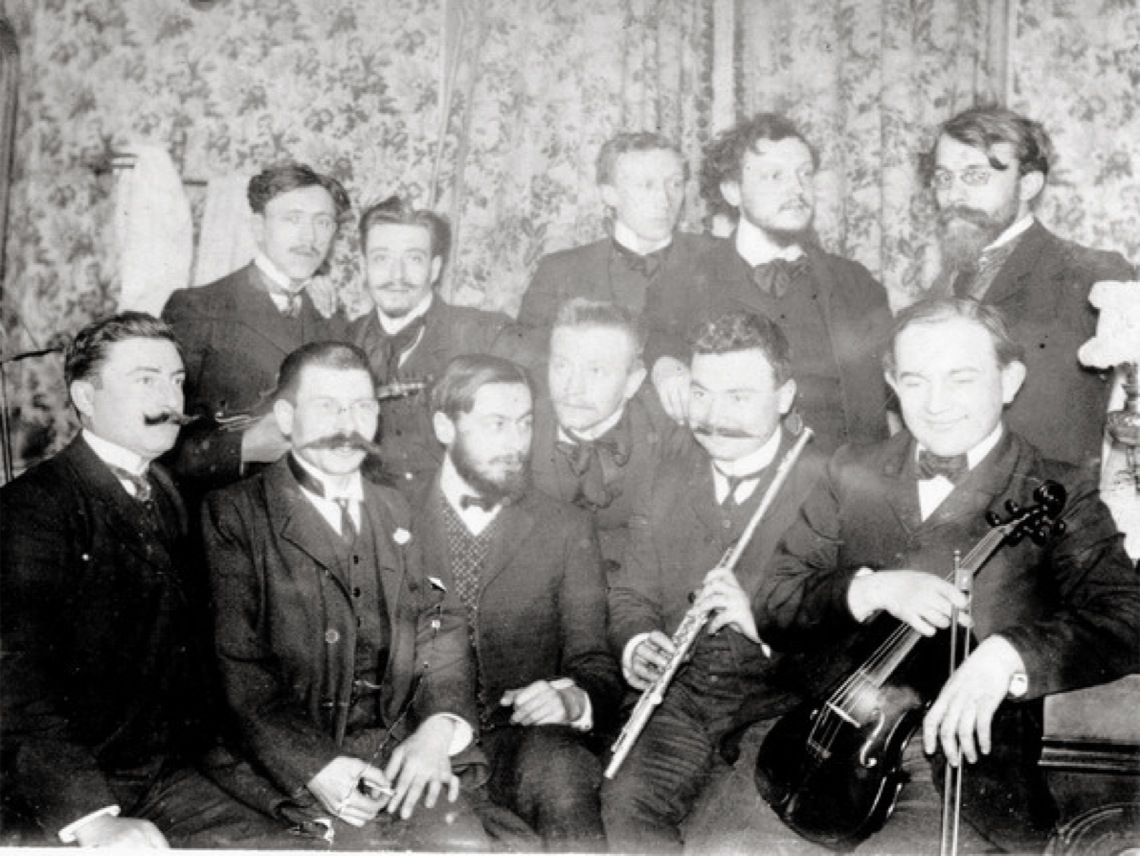
Abbaye de Créteil, group photograph

== Some works printed by the éditions de l’Abbaye ==
- Paul Adam, L'Art et la Nation "discours prononcé au banquet du 10-12-1906" (05-01-1907)
- Roger Allard, Vertes saisons, Poèmes [1905 - 1908] (01-04-1908)
- René Arcos, La tragédie des espaces (11-07-1906)
- Henri-Martin Barzun, Adolescence, rêveries, passions [1903- 1904]
- Henri-Martin Barzun, La Terrestre tragédie, nouvelle édition annotée - préface G. Kann (1908)
- Michael della Torre, Bouquet de Floréal (1908)
- Nicolas Deniker, Poèmes (02-09-1907)
- Georges Duhamel, Des légendes, des batailles (1907)
- Raoul Gaubert-Saint-Martial, Par ces longues nuits d'hiver (1908)
- Mécislas Golberg, (Cahiers N°1 et N°2 (1-07-1907)
- Louis Haugmard, Les Eveils d'Elinor (02-09-1907)
- Marcel Lenoir (pseudo. De Oury), Raison ou déraison du peintre Marcel Lenoir (1908)
- Prince Ferdinand de Liguori, Edmonda "drame historique en 6 actes" (1908)
- Jean Martet, Les Jeux du sistre et de la flûte (1908)
- Alexandre Mercereau, Gens de là et d'ailleurs (1907)
- Comte Robert de Montesquiou-Fezensac, Passiflora (10-1907)
- Charles Vildrac, Images et mirages (1907)
- Abel Pelletier, Marie-des-Pierres (Episodes passionnés) (01-07-1907)
- Jean Pilinsky de Belty, Les Prémices (29-06-1908)
- Pierre Rodet, Une touffe d'orties (1908)
- Jules Romains, La Vie unanime (10-02-1909)
- Valentine de Saint-Point, Poèmes d’orgueil (1908)
- Valder, Ma petite Jeannette, impression et souvenir d’enfance (1908)
- Gaston Sauvebois, Après le Naturalisme, vers la doctrine littéraire nouvelle (1908)
- Fritz R. Vander Pijl, Les Saisons Douloureuses (01-09-1907)
- Albert Verdot, Vers les couchants, runes et bucrânes (1908)
- Charles Vildrac, Images et mirages (22-11-1907)
- Triptyque (20-06-1907)
- Poèmes 1905 [2ème édition]
- Lucien Linard printed the first book of poetry by Pierre Jean Jouve, Artificiel, with a front page illustration by Albert Gleizes (1909)

== See also ==
- Europe, literary journal founded in 1923 by members of the Abbaye
- Free verse
