= Composition for "Jazz" =

Painting by Albert Gleizes

- Composition pour "Jazz" (French)
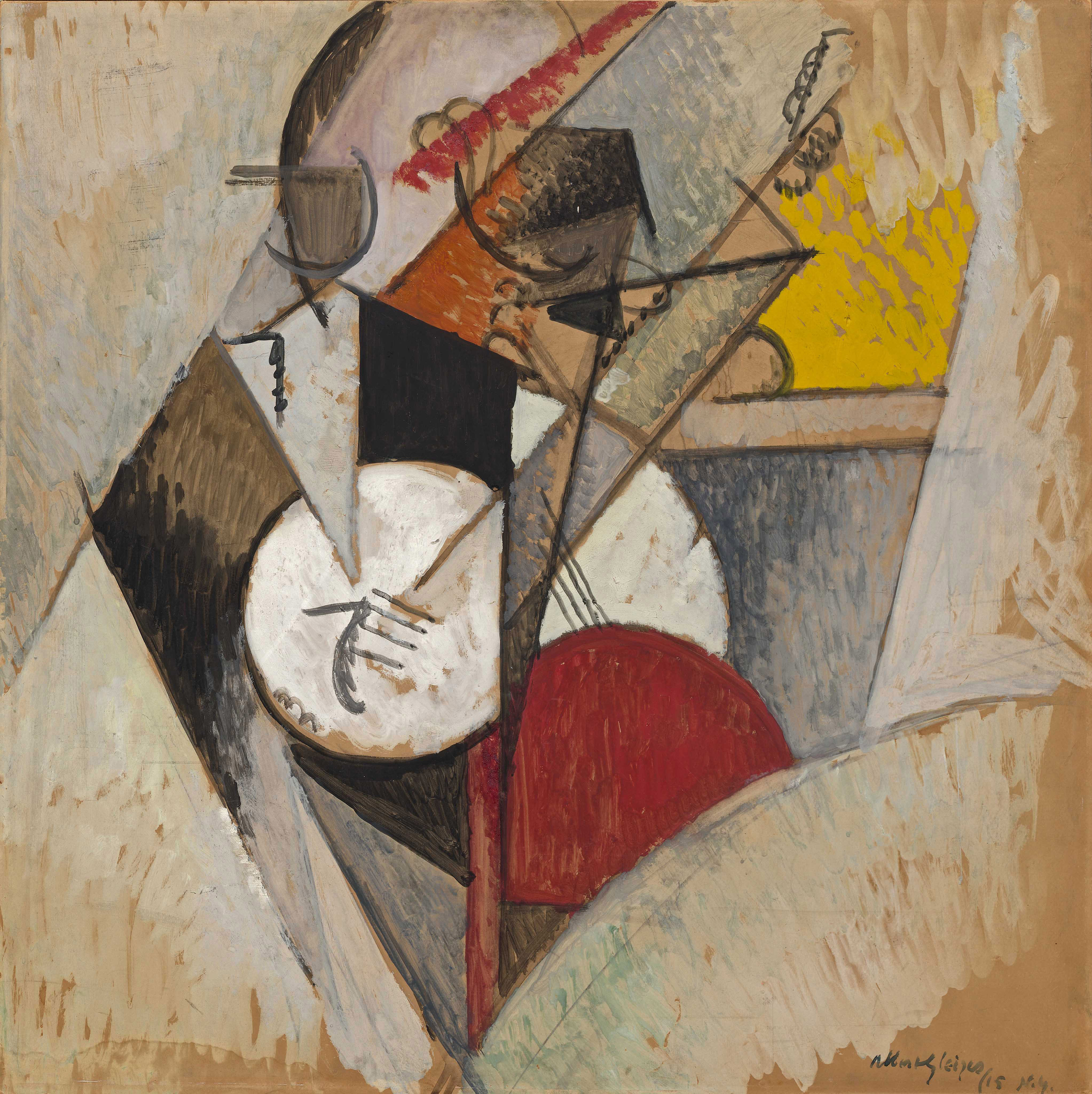
- Artist: Albert Gleizes
- Year: 1915
- Medium: Gouache on cardboard, mounted on Masonite
- Dimensions: 73 cm × 73 cm (28 3/4 in × 28 3/4 in)
- Location: Solomon R. Guggenheim Museum, New York

Composition for "Jazz", or Composition (For "Jazz"), is a 1915 painting by the French artist, theorist and writer Albert Gleizes. This Cubist work was reproduced in a photograph of Gleizes working on the painting in the Xeic York Herald, then published in The Literary Digest, 27 November 1915 (p. 1225). Composition for "Jazz" was purchased in 1938 by Solomon R. Guggenheim from Feragil Gallery, New York and forms part of the Solomon R. Guggenheim Founding Collection. The painting is in the permanent collection of the Solomon R. Guggenheim Museum in New York City.

== Description ==
Composition for "Jazz" is a gouache on cardboard, mounted on Masonite measuring 73 × 73 cm (28 3/4 by 28 3/4 inches), inscribed to the lower right 'Albert Gleizes / 15, N.Y.'

A precursor to Crystal Cubism, Composition for "Jazz" consists of broad, overlapping planes of black, white and two primary colors, yellow and red, dynamically intersecting diagonal lines coupled with circular movements. Despite its highly abstract nature, two figures emerge, one in the 'foreground' and one towards the upper center of the composition. The principal figure, to the left, appears to be playing a banjo. The treatment of the paint is erratic, brushstrokes rapidly applied, almost expressionistic in placement. The composition is dynamic, not in time, but in spatial elements. Details such as the banjo strings and the hand strumming them are delicately yet nervously rendered. Facial features are reduced to mere lines crossing an arc-shaped head. The head of the musician on the left is poised vertiginously on top of a man's body, as if disconnected, balanced somehow in unstable equilibrium. The lines, arcs, colors, and brushstrokes are together juxtaposed seemingly at random, as if the entire composition were an improvised memory of a jazz performance.

== Background ==
Around 1912 the four-string banjo and saxophones became popular in New York, with ensembles such as the Clef Club Orchestra playing music by black composers. They played at Carnegie Hall between 1912 and 1914. Their performances generated respectability in white society. From around 1915, early jazz performances consisted primarily of small ensembles (four or five musicians) of exciting, wild, instinctual, and almost entirely improvised polyphony.

Juliette Roche Gleizes gave an evocative description of the couple's first night in New York City and the spectacular experience that inspired Gleizes to work on the theme of jazz. Art historian Daniel Robbins recounts:

They arrived in the late afternoon, drove to the Albemarle Hotel on Forty-fifth Street, and almost immediately set out for a long walk. After about two hours they entered a restaurant in Harlem where a black jazz group was performing with extraordinary vitality and force. It was an electrifying experience, comparable, they felt, to the discovery of Stravinsky. Within a few days Gleizes produced the present work, followed shortly afterwards by a full-scale oil entitled Jazz [Jazz, 1915, oil on board, 100 x 75 cm, Deroudille collection, Lyon]. In spite of its title, the Guggenheim picture may represent a slightly different response to the same experience, rather than a specific study for the Deroudille work.

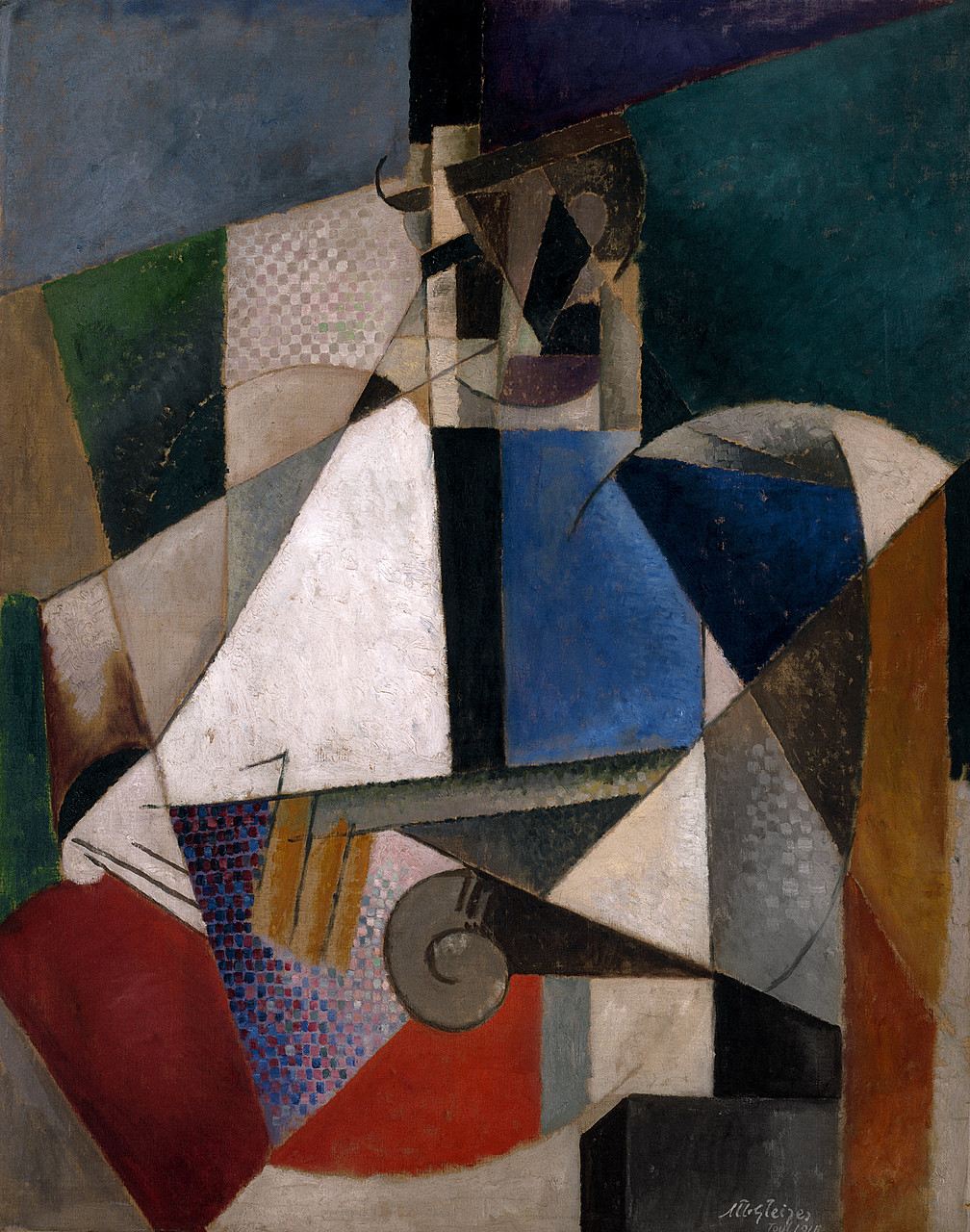
Albert Gleizes, 1914–15, Portrait of an Army Doctor (Portrait d'un médecin militaire), oil on canvas, 119.8 x 95.1 cm, Solomon R. Guggenheim Museum. Painted at the fortress city of Toul (Lorraine) while Gleizes served in the military during the First World War

During the months of autumn, following his demobilization in 1915, Gleizes married Juliette Roche and moved to New York. There they were met by Carlos Salzedo, Francis Picabia, Man Ray, Marcel Duchamp, and Jean Crotti (who would eventually marry Suzanne Duchamp). Marcel Duchamp had emigrated to New York several months earlier after being judged physically unfit for his service in the military. Shortly after his arrival, Gleizes, accompanied by Salzedo, frequented jazz clubs in Harlem. With all it had to offer, New York had a strong impact on the artist's production, leading to abstract works virtually free of visual subject matter.

Gleizes had been to Paris, Bermuda and Barcelona following a short stint serving the military at the fortress city of Toul, late 1914 early 1915, prior to his arrival to New York City. His arrival in Paris after his self-imposed exile saw the new style already underway. Yet independently, Gleizes had been working in a similar direction as early as 1914–15: Portrait of an Army Doctor (Portrait d'un médecin militaire), 1914–15 (Solomon R. Guggenheim Museum); Musician (Florent Schmitt), 1915 (Solomon R. Guggenheim Museum); and with a much more ambitious subject matter: Le Port de New York, 1917 (Thyssen-Bornemisza Museum).

As other wartime works by Gleizes, Portrait of an Army Doctor represented a break from the first phase of Cubism. These wartime works marked "the beginning of an attempt to preserve specific and individual visual characteristics while experimenting with a radically different compositional treatment in which broad planes, angled from the perimeter, meet circles." (Robbins, 1964) Rather than based on the analysis of volumetric objects, the artist strove toward synthesis; something that originated in unity.

"Gleizes was tremendously impressed by New York City", writes Robbins, "but the earliest New York paintings continued without break the formal research advanced at Toul (nos. 71-75) even though the influence of new subject matter is apparent."

The period of profound reflection of which Composition pour "Jazz" is a precursor (viz. Crystal Cubism) contributed to the constitution of a new mindset; a prerequisite for fundamental change. The flat surface, wrote Gleizes in 1925, became the starting point for a revaluation of the fundamental principles of painting. Rather than relying on the purely intellectual, the focus now was on the immediate experience of the senses, based on the idea according to Gleizes, that form, 'changing the directions of its movement, will change its dimensions' ["La forme, modifiant ses directions, modifiait ses dimensions"], while revealing the "basic elements" of painting, the "true, solid rules—rules which could be generally applied". It was Jean Metzinger and Juan Gris who, again according to Gleizes, "did more than anyone else to fix the basic elements... the first principles of the order that was being born". "But Metzinger, clear-headed as a physicist, had already discovered those rudiments of construction without which nothing can be done." Ultimately, it was Gleizes who would take the synthetic factor furthest of all.

== Exhibitions ==
- New York City, Solomon R. Guggenheim Museum SRGM, 164-T, Albert Gleizes, no. 78, repr. p. 68; New York, 196; 202, p. 53, repr.
- Portland, Oregon, Solomon R. Guggenheim Museum (SRGM) 19-T (no cat.); New York, no. 78
- Toronto, SRGM 85-T, no. 16
- New York, SRGM 87; 89 (no cat.); 95, 129, 144
- San Francisco Museum of Art, September 17–November 1, 1964, cat. no. 78
- Champaigne, IL. Krannert Art Museum
- The Columbus Gallery of Fine Art
- City Art Museum of ST. Louis, IL.
- Ottawa, Ontario, National Gallery of Canada
- Buffalo, New York, Albright–Knox Art Gallery
- Chicago, IL. Arts Club of Chicago

== Related works ==
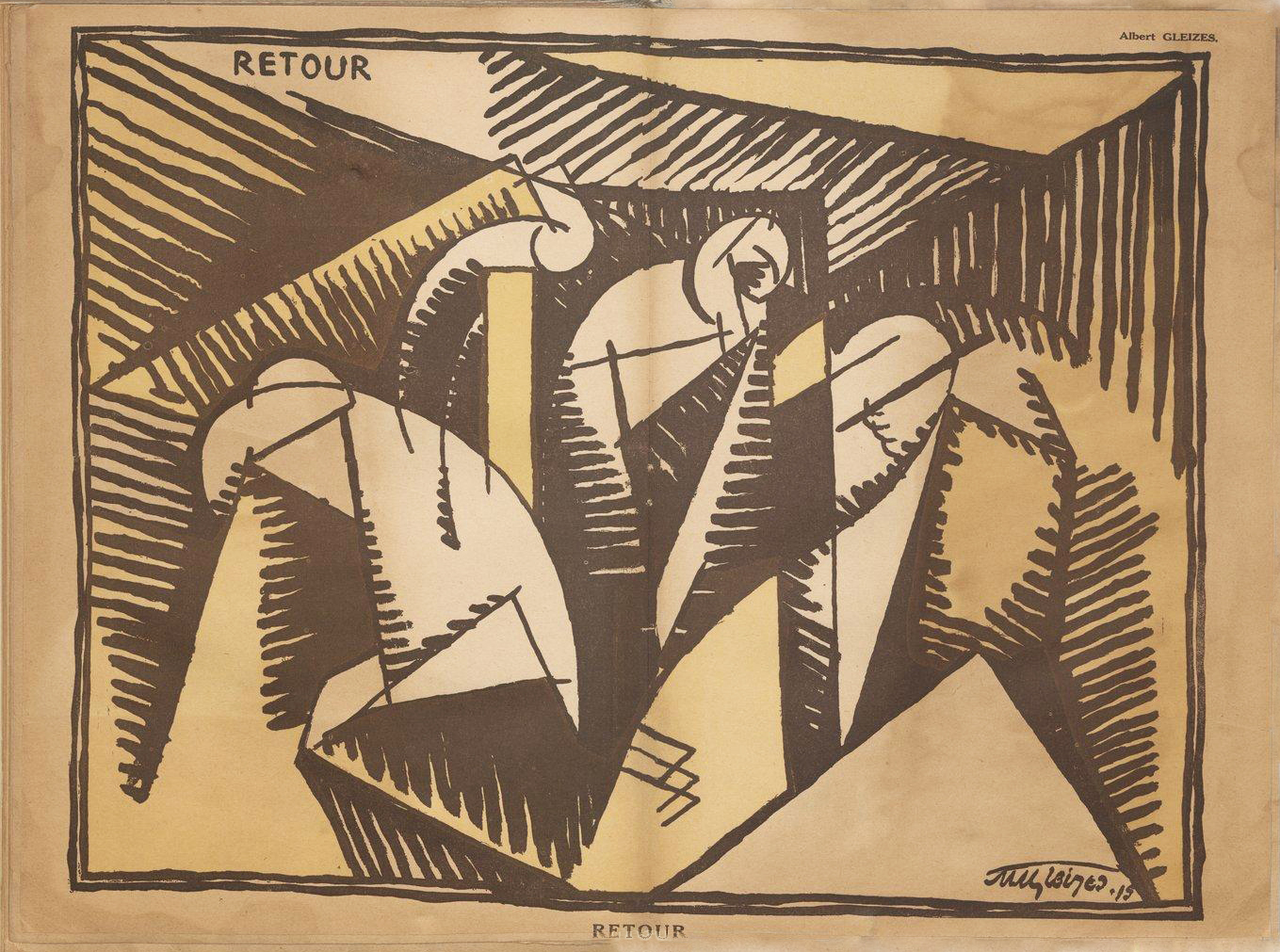
Albert Gleizes, 1915, Retour de Bois-le-Prêtre, wood engraving, 39 x 50 cm, published in Le mot, n. 20, 1 July 1915

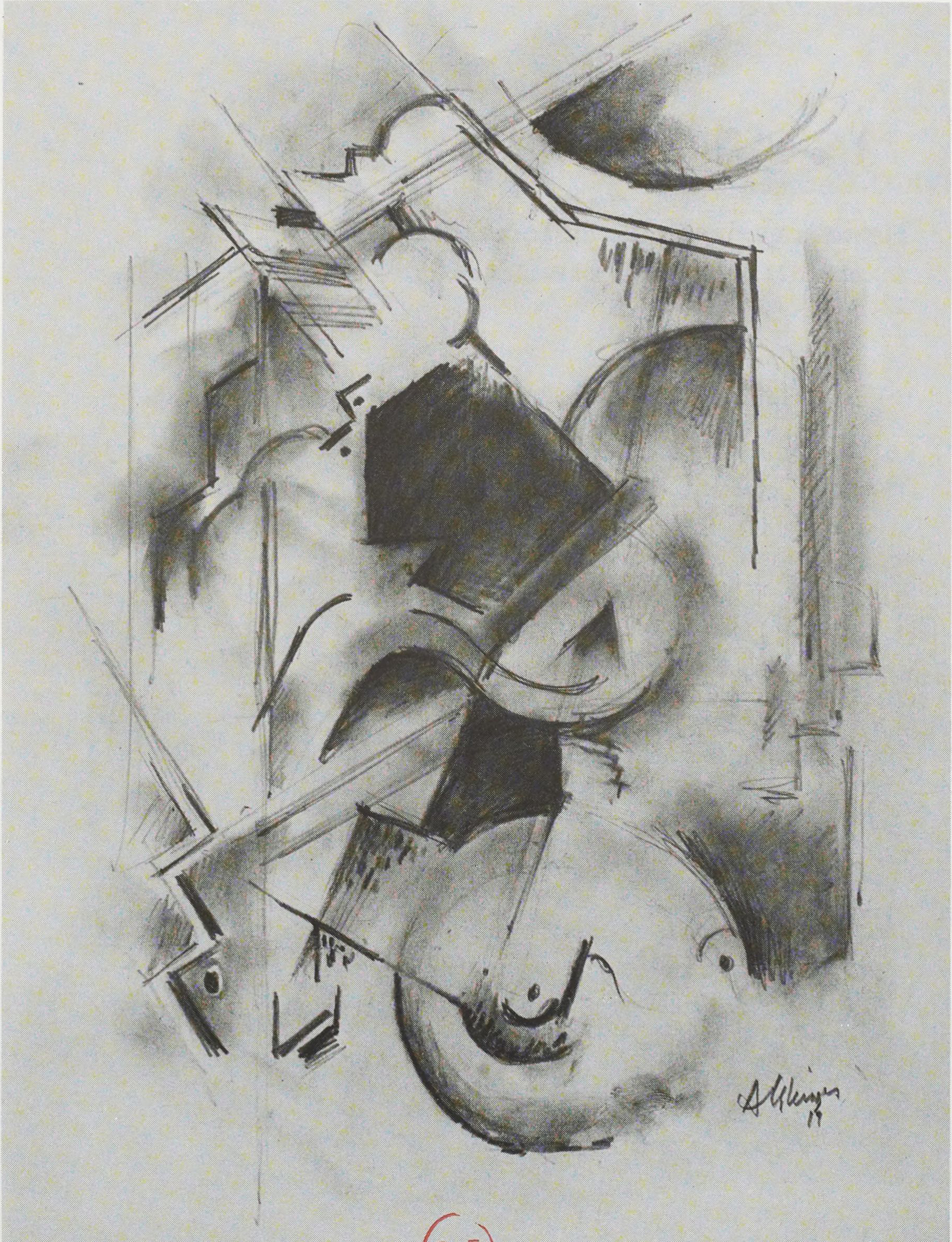
Albert Gleizes, 1914–15, Portrait de Florent Schmitt (Le Pianiste), pastel, 36 x 27 cm. This is a study for an oil on canvas titled Portrait de Florent Schmitt, 1914–15, 200 cm × 152 cm (78.5 in × 60 in)

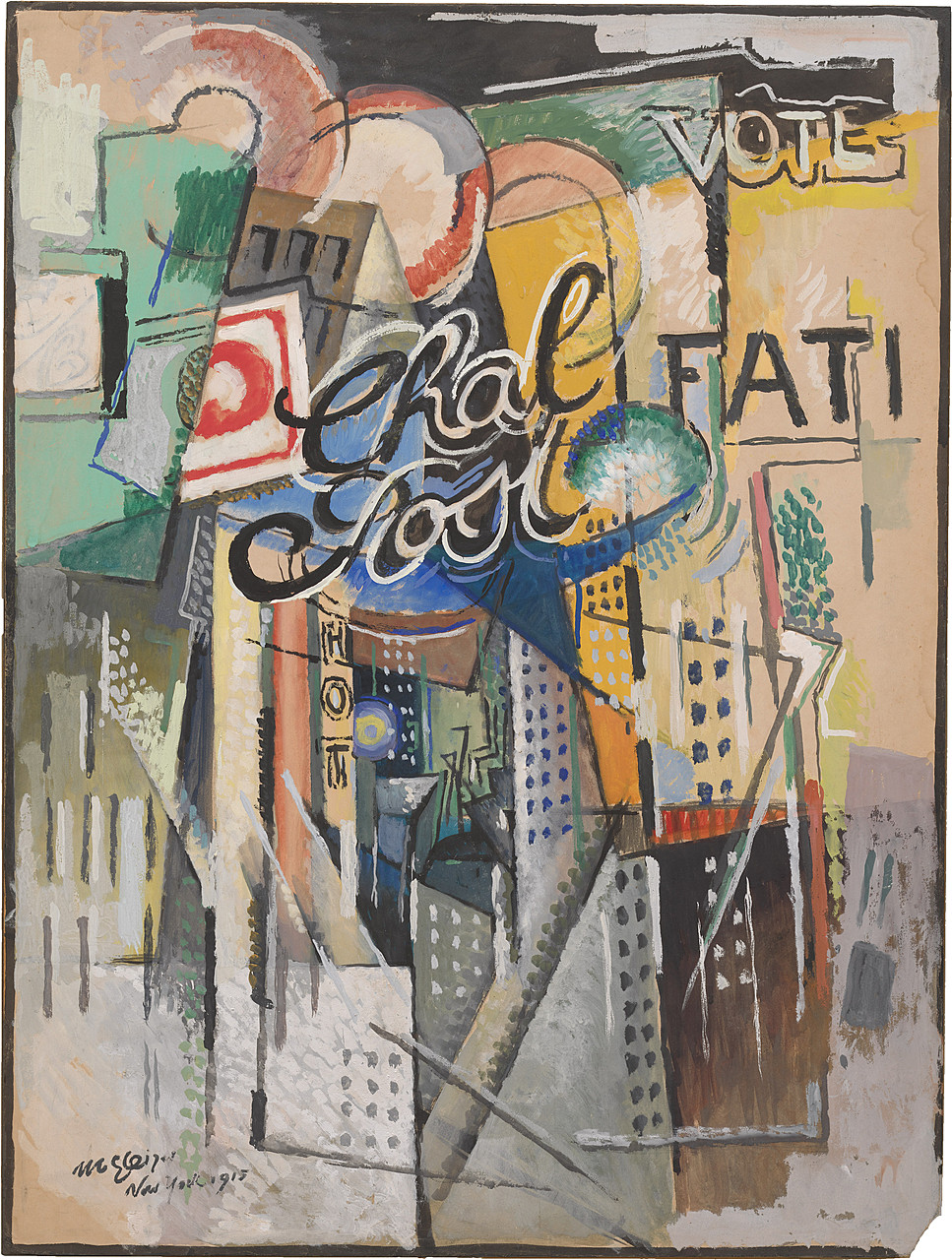
Albert Gleizes, 1915, Chal Post, oil and gouache on board, 101.8 x 76.5 cm, Solomon R. Guggenheim Museum, New York

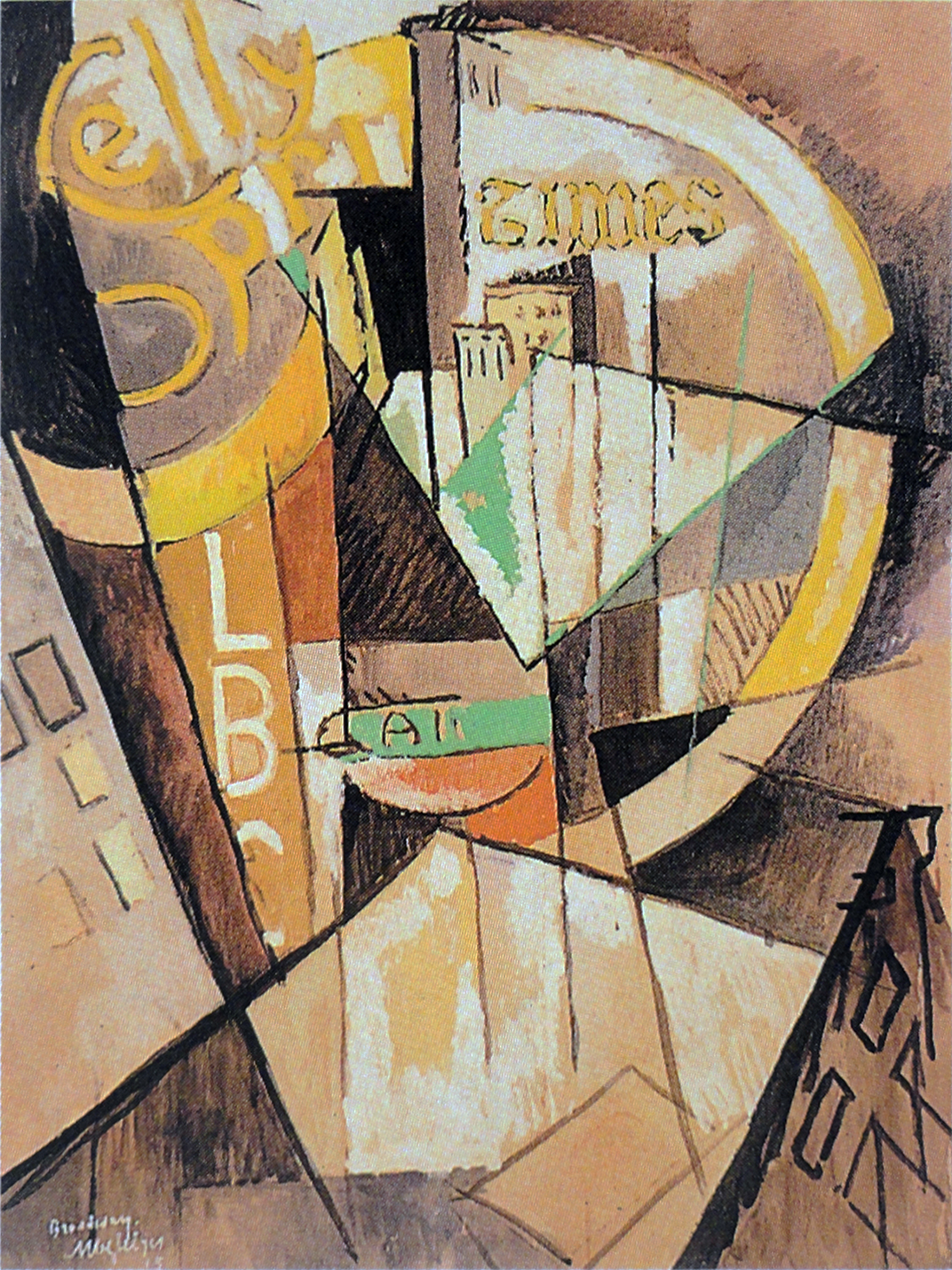
Albert Gleizes, 1915, Broadway, oil on board, 98.5 x 76 cm, private collection

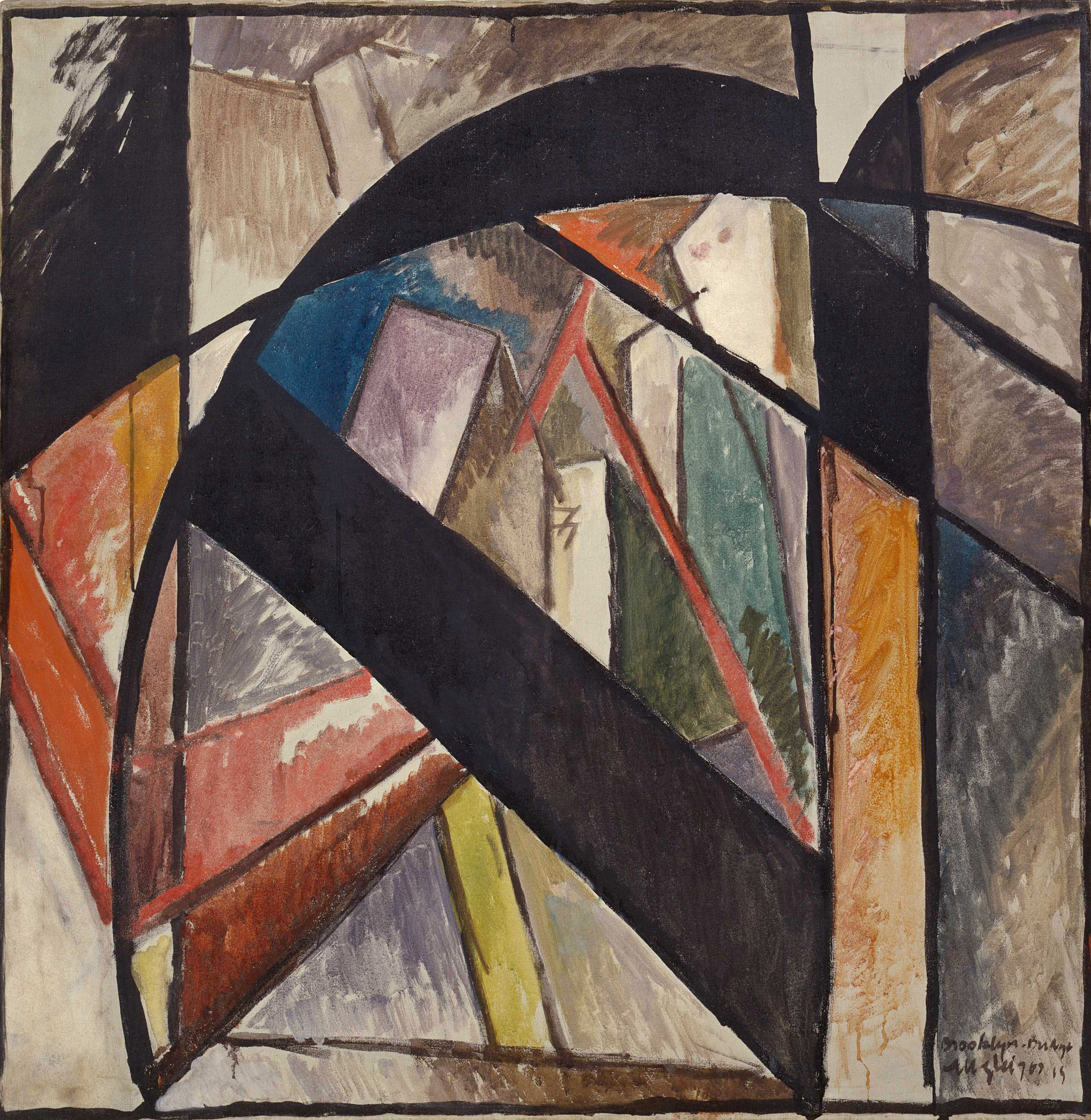
Albert Gleizes, 1915, Brooklyn Bridge (Pont de Brooklyn), oil and gouache on canvas, 102 x 102 cm, Solomon R. Guggenheim Museum, New York

== See also ==
- Jazz (Henri Matisse)
- List of works by Albert Gleizes
