= Jazz (Henri Matisse) =

1947 artist's book by Henri Matisse

- Editor: Tériade
- Author: Henrí Matisse
- Language: French
- Genre: Artist Book
- Publication date: 1947

Cover of Jazz by Henri Matisse

Henri Matisse’s Jazz is a limited-edition art book containing prints of colorful cut-paper collages, accompanied by the artist's written thoughts. It was first issued on 30 September 1947 by the art publisher Tériade. The portfolio, characterized by vibrant colors, poetic texts, and circus and theater themes, marks Matisse's transition to a new medium. It is considered one of the most important artist books of the 20th Century and Matisse's first masterpiece made using cut-outs.

== Creation ==
Diagnosed with abdominal cancer in 1941, Matisse underwent surgery in Lyon that saved his life, but left him chair- and bed-bound. Limited in mobility, he could no longer paint or sculpt. Instead, he cut forms from colored paper that he arranged as collages, and decoupage which became known as the “cut-outs”. In the early 1930's Matisse had used shapes cut from colored paper for his Dance murals for the Barnes Foundation in Philadelphia, Jazz, however, represents the first time cut-outs became a complete medium for him

Tériade had been suggesting that Matisse create an album of cut-outs starting in 1940. In 1941, at the age of 74, Matisse began Jazz. His assistants, notably Lydia Delectorskaya, helped prepare the collages for printing, using a stencil process known as pochoir in French. Delectorskaya pinned the cut-out forms into place, then Matisse critiqued the positioning and suggested changes. He worked on the series for two years, utilizing this new method that linked drawing and color—two important elements in Matisse's work. Matisse referred to this technique as "drawing with scissors." A major distinction with this for Matisse was that rather than creating an outline and then filling in the color, he was using scissors to draw directly in color.

The designs were initially intended as covers for Verve, a French art magazine published by Tériade. In 1947, Tériade issued the compositions in an artist's portfolio. The book included 20 color prints, each about 16 by 26 inches (41 by 66 cm), as well as Matisse's handwritten notes expressing his thoughts throughout the process. Matisse wanted to introduce the prints individually in what he referred to as "the most favorable conditions." As a result he chose to separate them with handwritten pages with bold, large writing. Interestingly, the order of the color plates has no connection to the order in which they were completed nor the subject. The first part of the book is circus subjects, followed by five unlined compositions, and then five more circus themes.

The printers working for Verve struggled to reproduce the bold, heavily saturated colors of Matisse's painted paper collages. This was further complicated by the Nazi occupation of France and difficulty accessing materials and print shops. The most success was had using the Pochoir stencil printing style.

The cut-outs were created during World War II and the text was written in 1946 and 1947, after the surrender of Germany to the Allies in 1945. Tériade gave it the title Jazz, which Matisse liked because it suggested a connection between art and musical improvisation. Despite the low number of books printed, Jazz was well received.

Matisse put out two versions of Jazz: the book form and a portfolio of prints that could be displayed more easily.

Matisse began illustrating books in the 1930's. Following the publication of Jazz paper cutouts become Matisse's main artistic medium and he eventually stops painting altogether in the last period of his career, before his death in 1954.

== Themes ==
The circus, the title originally suggested for the book, provided inspiration for the majority of the motifs concerning performing artists and balancing acts. “These images, with their lively and violent tones, derive from crystallizations of memories of circuses, folktales, and voyages,” Matisse explains in the accompanying text. The figure of the circus artist, usually depicted alone, is often seen as a metaphor for the artist himself. Matisse planned to use the title Circus as late as March 1944, but in an interview published that same year he said the book would either be titled Circus or Jazz.

There is a darkness in the circus theme, as the scenes depicted include some sort of violence or the threat of it. The circus elements focus on the dangerous aspects of the performance that draws people in and makes them nervous or excited. Louis Aragon and Tériade both noted what they perceived as references to the war in Jazz, including the yellow in the Icarus cut-out as exploding shells.

The first prints illustrating the circus do not seem to have an immediate connection to the succeeding works. However, these compositions are viewed as metaphors of life. The overall themes in Jazz derive from biographical elements, such as Matisse's recollection of his travels to Tahiti in the three "Lagoon" sheets (XVII–XIX), as well as broader aspects including love (V, VI), death (X), and fate (XVI).

The text of Jazz was written quite a while after the illustrations were completed. So, the pictures were not meant as illustrations to a specific text. This leaves the pictures open to a great deal of interpretation.

== Context ==
Matisse had moved away from easel painting in 1929 and did not return to it until 1934-35. It was during this period that he began to experiment with cut-outs. In the last period of his career, Matisse moved away from painting all together, focusing entirely on cut-outs. He would go on to use these techniques on a wide variety of project over the course of the last decade of his life, from small pieces to large murals.

Matisse began Jazz while France was under Nazi occupation during World War II. The occupation brought widespread suffering, including family separations, arrests, executions, and mass shortages of essential supplies. While Matisse himself remained relatively comfortable during this time, Matisse's family had several members who participated in the resistance, and faced serious risks including torture and imprisonment. His wife Amelie and daughter Marguerite were arrested by the Gestapo in the spring of 1944. Amelie was sentenced to a six month prison term, but there was no news of Marguerite until the Allies' liberation of Paris, when she is freed.

In the summer through autumn of 1947, Matisse created the text to accompany the images. This means the text was created after Germany surrendered to the Allies. Jazz is the only one of Matisse's artist books for which he is both author and illustrator.

Jazz was released when Matisse was 77 years old and caused a renewed interest in the artist at an international scale.

== List of prints ==
The titles of the individual sheets, together with supplementary explanations by his assistant Lydia Delectorskaya, in English translation, are:

1. "The Clown"
2. "The Circus"
3. "Monsieur Loyal" (a well-known Parisian circus director in the nineteenth century)
4. "The Nightmare of the White Elephant"
5. "The Horse, the Rider and Clown"
6. "The Wolf" (i.e. the wolf from Red Riding Hood, the fairy tale by Charles Perrault. It is also an allusion to Hitler, i.e. contemporary history)
7. "The Heart"
8. "Icarus"
9. "Forms"
10. "Pierrot's Funeral"
11. "The Codomas" (two famous trapeze artists)
12. "The Swimmer in the Tank" (a memory of a performance Matisse saw in the aquarium of the Folies-Bergère)
13. "The Sword Swallower"
14. "The Cowboy"
15. "The Knife Thrower"
16. "Destiny"
17. "Lagoon I"
18. "Lagoon II"
19. "Lagoon III"
20. "Toboggan" (slide)

== Theft ==
On 7 December 2025, thieves stole 8 illustrations from a copy of the book at the Biblioteca Mário de Andrade. They were recovered in Sao Paulo, Brazil on 13 August 2026.

== See also ==
- List of works by Henri Matisse
- Composition for "Jazz" (Albert Gleizes)

== References and sources ==
Sources

- Jazz by Henri Matisse, introduction by Riva Castleman, George Braziller 1983 ISBN 0-8076-1075-5
- Jazz by Henri Matisse, introduction by Dominique Szymusiak, Editions Anthese 2005
