= Brooklyn Bridge (Gleizes) =

Painting by Albert Gleizes

- Pont de Brooklyn (French)
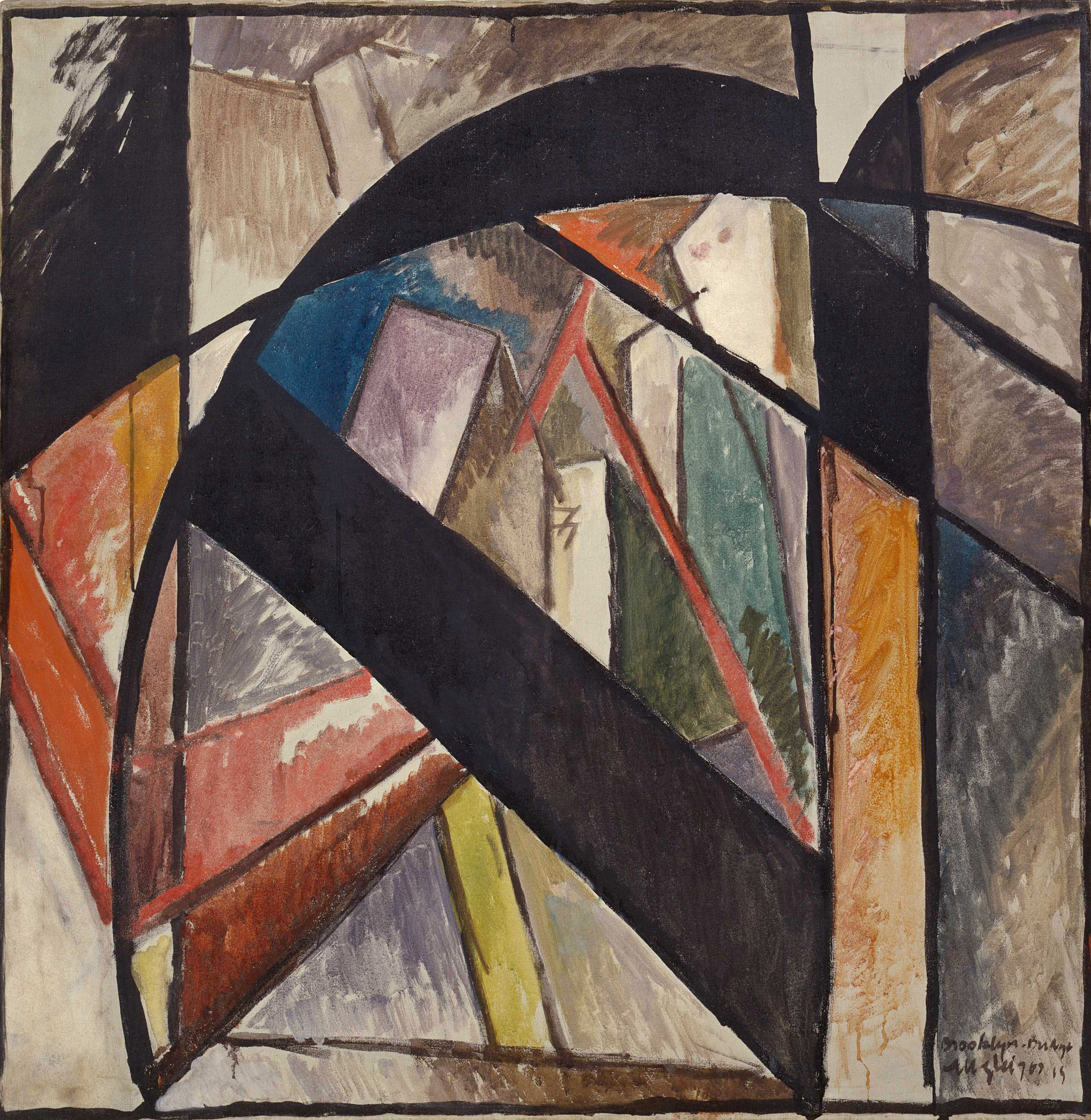
- Artist: Albert Gleizes
- Year: 1915
- Medium: Oil and gouache on canvas
- Dimensions: 102 cm × 102 cm (40.15 in × 40.15 in)
- Location: Solomon R. Guggenheim Museum, New York

Brooklyn Bridge is a 1915 painting by the French artist, theorist and writer Albert Gleizes. Brooklyn Bridge was exhibited at the Montross Gallery, New York, 1916 (no. 40) along with works by Jean Crotti, Marcel Duchamp and Jean Metzinger.

This is the first in a series of three highly abstract paintings by Gleizes of the Brooklyn Bridge. It was the most abstract painting of the bridge to date. Gleizes and the Italian-American artist Joseph Stella had been friends since 1915 and it has been of interest to compare this painting with Stella's Brooklyn Bridge of 1919-20.

The American collector John Quinn acquired Brooklyn Bridge and several other works by Gleizes that had been on view at Montross Gallery, either during the exhibition or subsequently. In 1927, an exhibition and sale of Quinn's art collection took place in New York City. The sale was conducted by Otto Bernet and Hiram H. Parke at the American Art Galleries. A catalogue was published for the occasion by the American Art Association. Brooklyn Bridge (n. 263 of the catalogue) was purchased at the sale for $60.

Brooklyn Bridge forms part of the Solomon R. Guggenheim Founding Collection. It was gifted to the museum by Solomon Guggenheim between 1937 (the year of the formation of the foundation) and 1949, or purchased by the foundation during those years. The painting is in the permanent collection of the Solomon R. Guggenheim Museum in New York City.

== Description ==
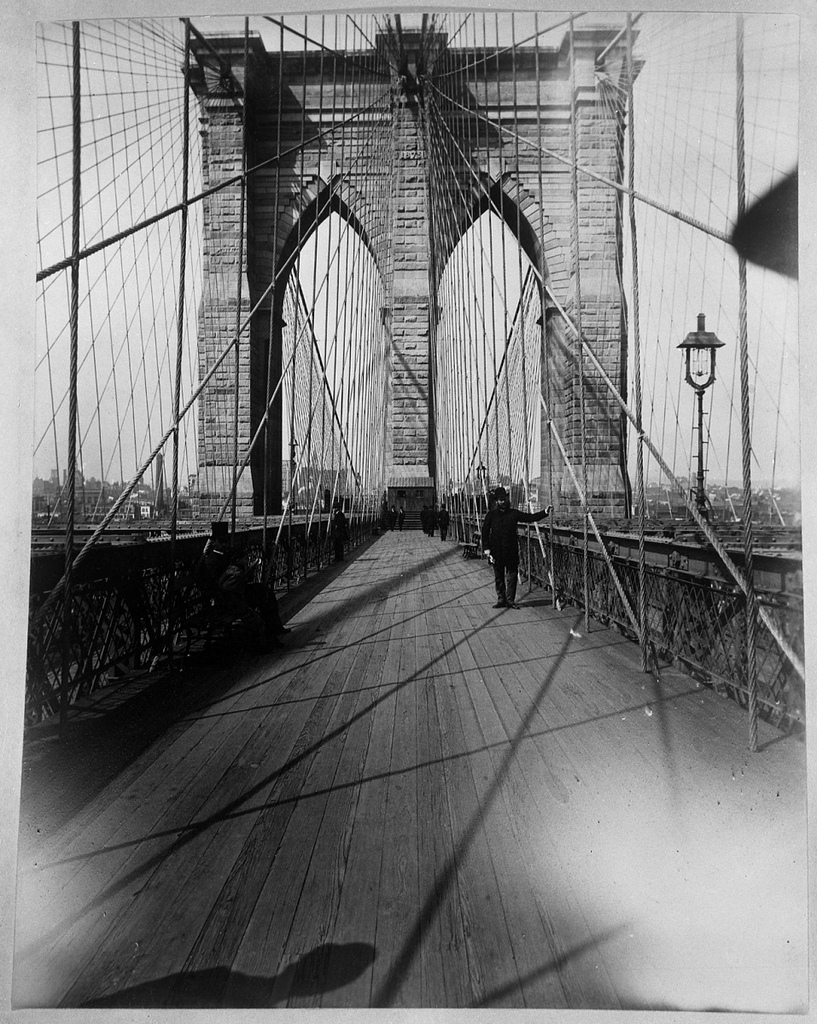
Breading G. Way Brooklyn Bridge, c.1888, Brooklyn Museum, Brooklyn Public Library

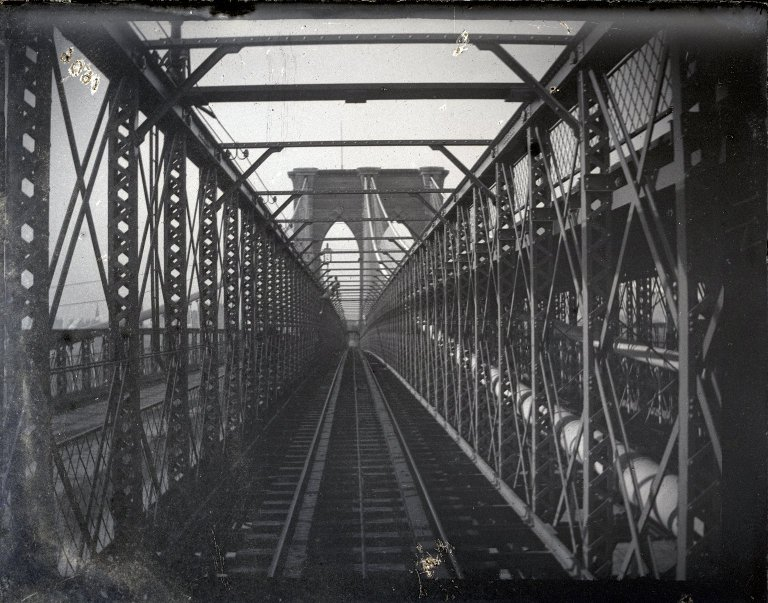
George Bradford Brainerd, The Brooklyn Bridge from Train, Brooklyn NY, between 1870 and 1889, Brooklyn Museum

Brooklyn Bridge is an oil and gouache painting on canvas with dimensions 102 x 102 cm (40 1/8 x 40 1/8 inches) inscribed "Brooklyn Bridge, Alb. Gleizes, 15, lower right.

In a celebration of this feat of modernity, the architecture of the Brooklyn Bridge served as the inspiration for a series of works by Gleizes. In this first painting of the series, juxtaposed arabesques and distinctive diagonals interconnect dynamically, suggesting the bridge's complex architectonic engineering.

As in earlier works by Gleizes, this canvas is directly engaged with the environment. While highly abstract, Brooklyn Bridge maintains an evident visual basis. From 1914 to the end of the New York period, however nonrepresentational, works by the artist continued to be shaped by his personal experience, by the conviction that art was a social function, susceptible to theoretical formulation, and imbued with optimism.

In Du "Cubisme" Gleizes and Metzinger wrote: "...let us admit that the reminiscence of natural forms cannot be banished—in any event, not yet. An art cannot be raised to the level of pure effusion at the first step."

Three years later, the transformation toward pure effusion would manifest itself in the Brooklyn Bridge and continue further still in subsequent works produced by the artist in New York. The features of the bridge are described by forceful rhythms and colors, even though the actual bridge itself has disappeared; superseded by a synthesis of Gleizes's plastic equivalents of physical reality. The three Brooklyn Bridge paintings are a prime example of Gleizes's experimentation with the plastic translation of one of his most treasured themes: the city which draws life from the river.

Already, in his 1913 publication The Cubist Painters, Aesthetic Meditations, Guillaume Apollinaire drew parallels between the work of Gleizes and the realization of metal constructions such as bridges:

Majesty: this is what, above all, characterizes the art of Albert Gleizes. He thus brings a startling innovation to contemporary art. Something that before him was found in but few of the modern painters.

This majesty arouses and provokes the imagination; considered from the plastic point of view, it is the immensity of things.

This art is vigorous. The pictures of Albert Gleizes are realized by a force of the same sort as that which realized the Pyramids and the Cathedrals, the constructions in metal, the bridges and the tunnels. (Apollinaire, 1913)

== Background ==
Gleizes stated his admiration for the Brooklyn Bridge in the first interview after his arrival in the United States, comparing it to the noblest achievements of European architecture.

The Brooklyn Bridge was a key component of the New York landscape for the Ashcan School, though it hadn't held for them the fascination that it did for the generation of modern artists that arrived or returned from Europe during the First World War.

Joseph Stella wrote of the Brooklyn Bridge: "Seen for the first time, as a weird metallic Apparition under a metallic sky, out of proportion with the winged lightness of its arch, traced for the conjunction of Worlds… it impressed me as the shrine containing all the efforts of the new civilization of America".

Albert Gleizes remarked: "the genius who built the Brooklyn Bridge is to be classed alongside the genius who built Notre Dame de Paris". Supporting Gleizes' claim that the Brooklyn Bridge belongs in the same category as the Notre Dame Cathedral, Marcel Duchamp said America's greatest works of art are its bridges and its plumbing. (Stella and Walter Arensberg accompanied Duchamp to a plumbing supply store in 1917 to purchase the infamous urinal, soon to be entitled Fountain and signed "R.Mutt").

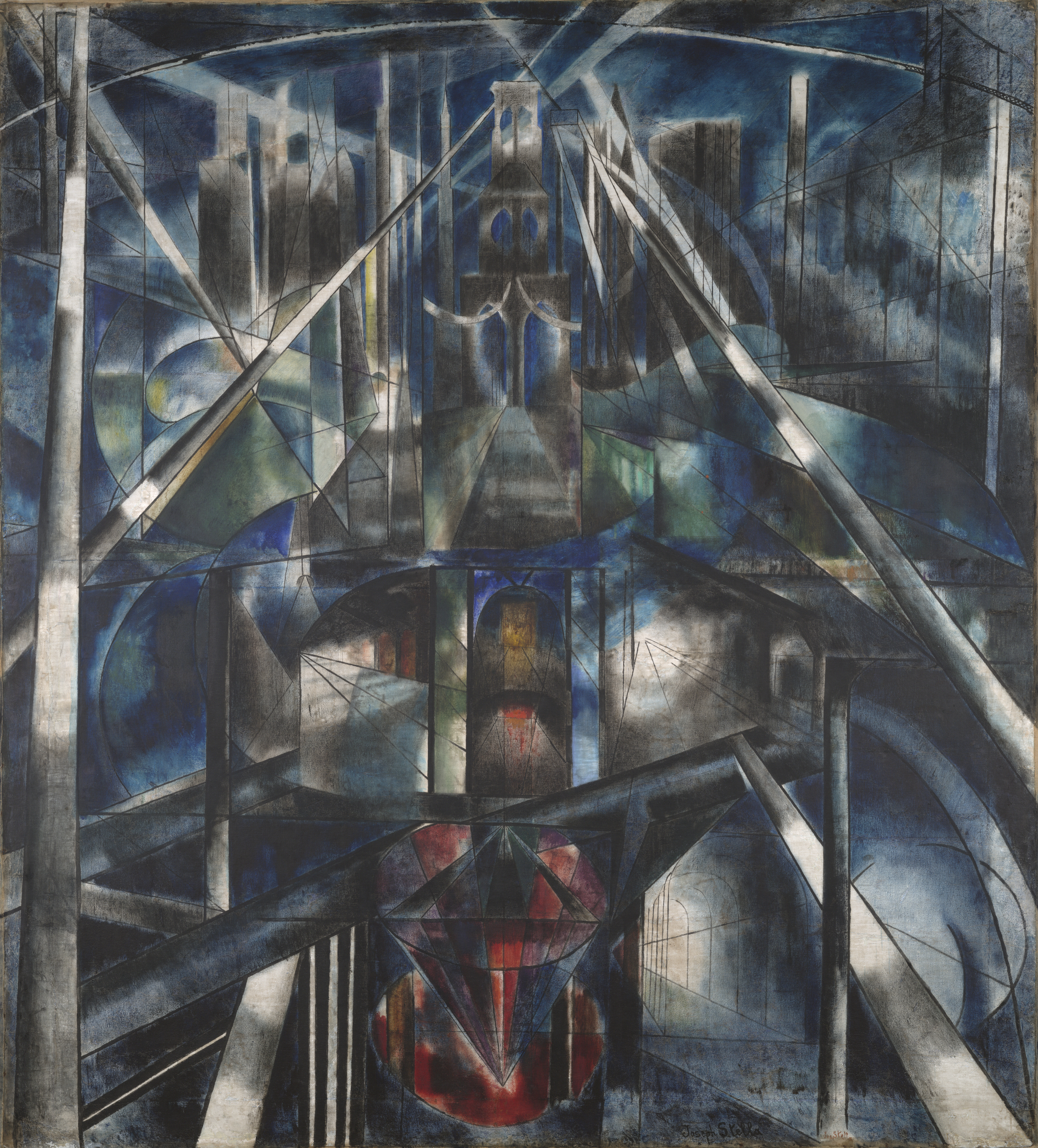
Joseph Stella, 1919-20, Brooklyn Bridge, oil on canvas, 215.3 x 194.6 cm, Yale University Art Gallery

Whereas other proto-modernists such as Henry James, H. G. Wells and Alvin Langdon Coburn pondered the bridge from a distance—contemplating its cultural and industrial aspects—artists like John Marin, Max Weber, Joseph Stella and Gleizes worked directly at the bridge itself, reveling in the personal experience. This is what Alan Trachtenberg called “the classic moment” when the bridge—in front of the eyes—transforms itself from a public icon to “a private event”. The classic moment is not studied or pondered but "entirely instant and radically subjective". It is a personal response to modernity of the unique structure, an attempt to “know the bridge from the inside”.

Stemming back to his years at the Abbaye de Créteil, the interest in ambitious subjects continued to inspire Albert Gleizes throughout the 1910s: Passy, Bridges of Paris, La Chasse (The Hunt), Harvest Threshing (Le Dépiquage des Moissons), Les Joueurs de football (Football Players). From 1915, Gleizes drew inspiration from the music of jazz, from the skyscrapers of New York, from neon signs, from the hustle and bustle of busy Manhattan streets and avenues such as Broadway, and from the Brooklyn Bridge; expressing the various sensations and vast drama of modern city life in an unprecedented series of works.

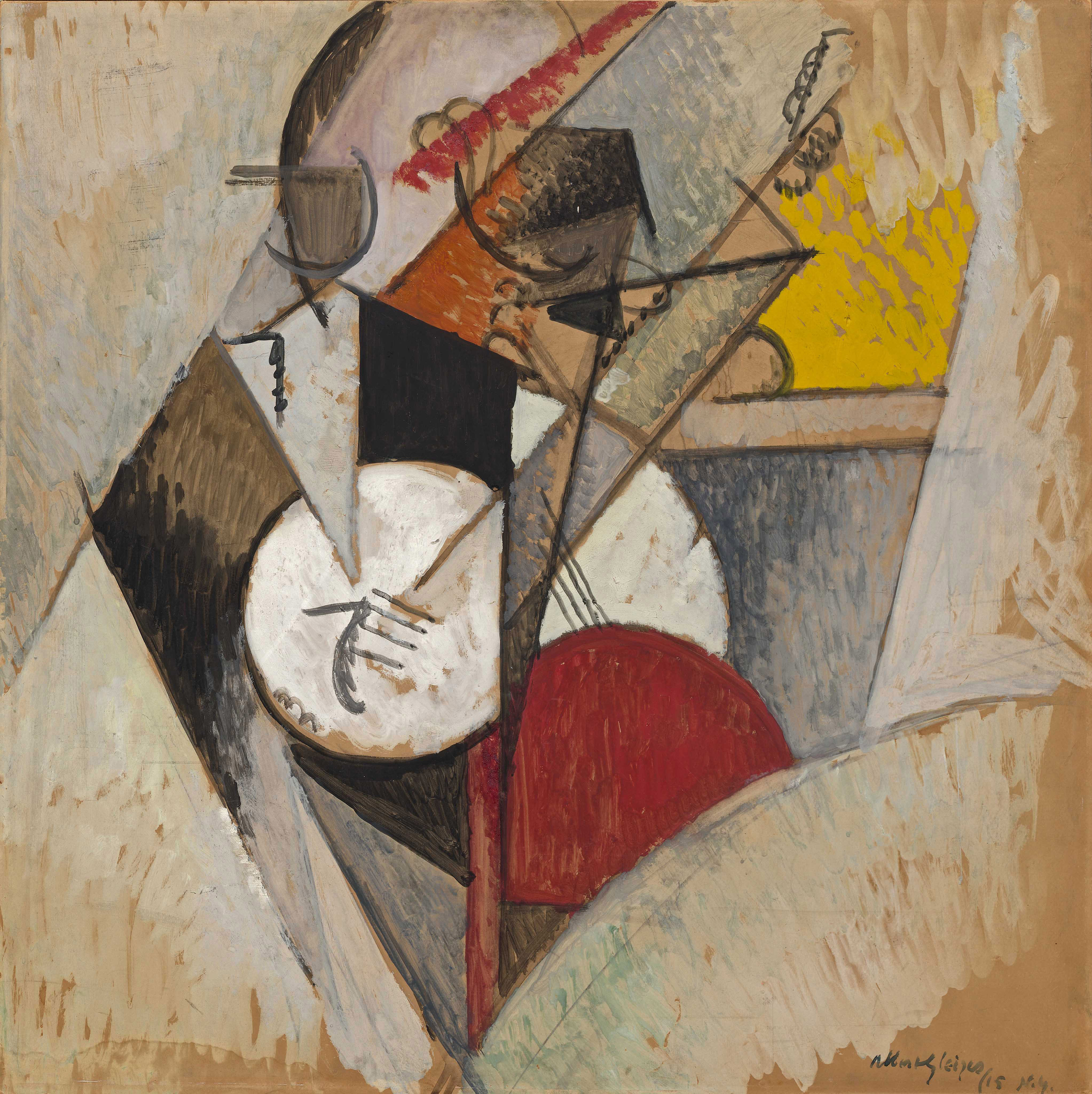
Albert Gleizes, 1915, Composition for "Jazz", oil on cardboard, 73 x 73 cm, Solomon R. Guggenheim Museum, New York

During the months of autumn, following his demobilization in 1915, Gleizes married Juliette Roche and moved to New York. There they were met by Carlos Salzedo, Francis Picabia, Man Ray, Marcel Duchamp, and Jean Crotti (who would eventually marry Suzanne Duchamp). Marcel Duchamp had emigrated to New York several months earlier after being judged physically unfit for his service in the military. Shortly after his arrival, Gleizes, accompanied by Salzedo, frequented jazz clubs in Harlem. With all it had to offer, New York had a strong impact on the artist's production.

Gleizes had previously been to New York for the occasion of the Armory Show (which in 1913 introduced European modern art to an American audience), exhibiting his La Femme aux Phlox (Woman with Phlox)’’, Museum of Fine Arts, Houston, and L'Homme au Balcon, Man on a Balcony (Portrait of Dr. Théo Morinaud)’’, Philadelphia Museum of Art.

In New York Gleizes met Walter Pach (who he knew from Paris), Stuart Davis, Max Weber, Joseph Stella, and participated in a show at Montross Gallery (April 1916)—exhibiting Brooklyn Bridge—with Duchamp, Crotti and Metzinger (who remained in Paris). At this exhibition the group was dubbed 'The Four Musketeers' in the press. The Montross exhibition introduced some of the most avant-garde French art of the time to the New York art scene, causing a sensation and once again forcing American artists to rethink their ideas about art. This exhibitions demonstrated that there existed an even more radical approach in art than that offered by the Futurists and Cubists, who were considered at the time to represent the most extreme forms of art.

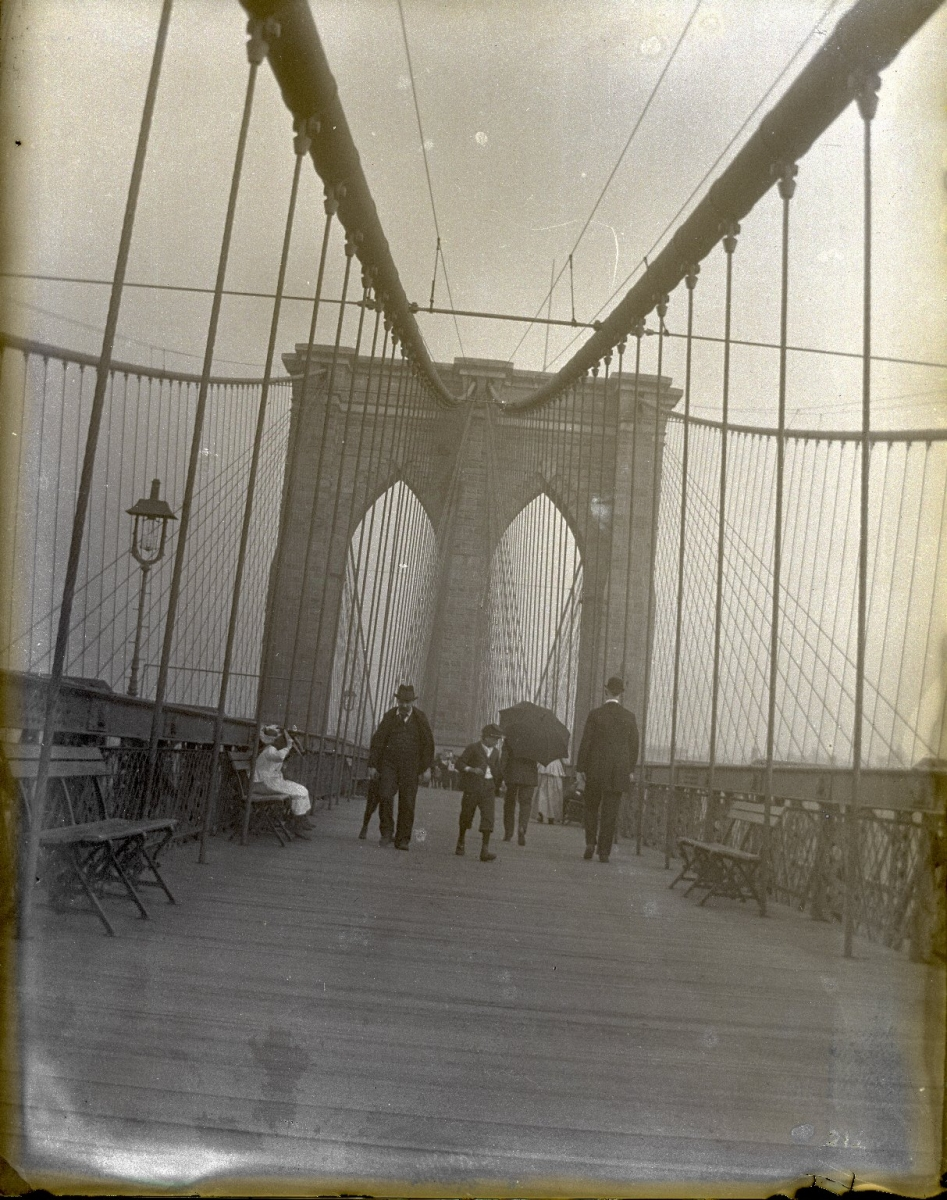
Edgar S. Thomson, Brooklyn Bridge, 1895, Brooklyn Museum, Brooklyn Public Library

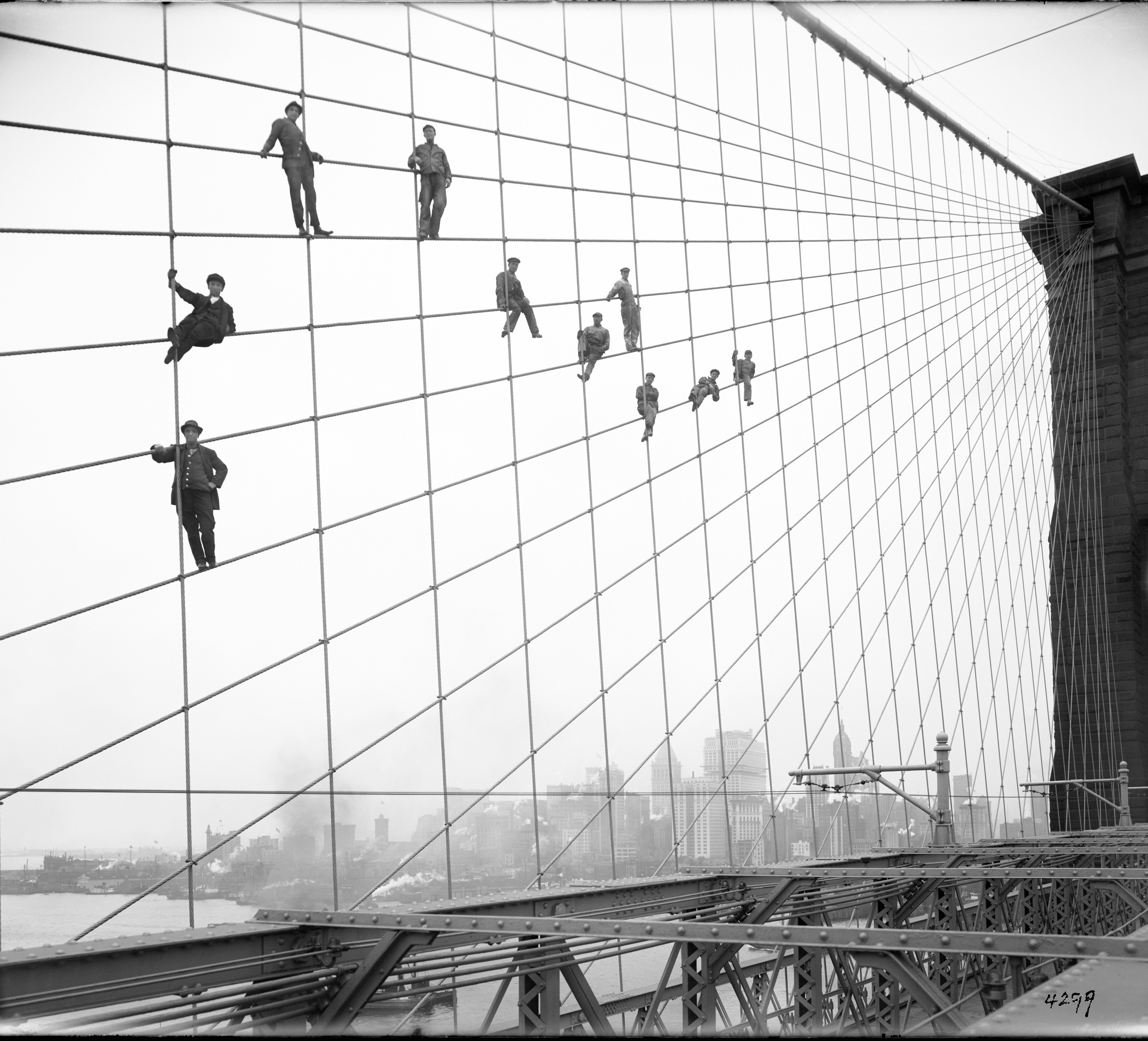
Painters suspended on cables of the Brooklyn Bridge, 7 October 1914

After Gleizes returned to Europe, Stella became interested in the Bridge as a motif. In Paris, from 1911 to 1912, Stella had been in contact with the Cubists and Italian Futurists, who admired contemporary concepts of the future, including motion, speed and technological triumphs of humanity over nature. When he return to New York he moved to Brooklyn and there found in the Bridge the perfect vehicle for his Futurist vision, though he was also interested in the structural experiments of the Cubists and the dynamic color of the Fauves.

== Abstraction ==
Gleizes' Brooklyn Bridge (his first painting of the bridge) was the most abstract image made of the bridge to date. His second version, also of 1915, measuring 148.1 x 120.4 cm (58¼ x 47 3/8in.), is entirely abstract. His third and last oil painting of the series, dated 1917 and entitled On Brooklyn Bridge (Sur Brooklyn Bridge), Solomon R. Guggenheim Museum, New York, measures 161.8 x 129.5 cm (63 3/4 x 51 in.). This composition relates most closely with a 1915 drawing (25 x 19 cm). It is an attempt to synthesize New York City under the symbol of the bridge through a collection of unifying circles, spheres and arcs. In the composition Gleizes portrays both ends of the bridge with the East River below. The Manhattan skyline and Brooklyn appear in the distance. This 1917 canvas—the least abstract of the three—more so than the other paintings of the series, resembles Stella's 1919-20 painting.

Non-objective painting rarely has to do with realistic qualities and yet it is still bound to the logic of painting as representational of the subject matter. In Andréi Nakov's study, Abstract/Concrete - Russian and Polish Non-objective Art, non-representation itself becomes the impetus for depicting a subject. In his last book, Painting and on Man become Painter, written in 1948, Gleizes warns against the trend of non-representation becoming an end unto itself, insisting on the importance, instead, of esemplastic qualities. For Gleizes, the latter prevails over the concepts of representational or abstract qualities of the painting.

Toward the end of 1913 Gleizes defended the need for a representational subject matter in 'Opinion' published by Ricciotto Canudo in Monjoie!, but it was for reasons that were entirely plastic and non-representational at the same time:

We are agreed that anecdote counts for nothing in a painted work. It is a pretext, so be it, but a pretext which we should not reject. Through a certain coefficient of imitation we will verify the legitimacy of the things we have discovered, the picture will not be reduced to the merely pleasurable arabesque of an oriental carpet, and we will obtain an infinite variety which would otherwise be impossible. (Gleizes, 1913)

In The Epic, From immobile form to mobile form, Gleizes writes:

As we can see straightaway, it is not a matter of describing, nor is it a matter of abstracting from, anything that is external to itself. There is a concrete act that has to be realized, a reality to be produced - of the same order as that which everyone is prepared to recognize in music, at the lowest level of the esemplastic scale, and in architecture, at the highest. Like any natural, physical reality, painting, understood in this way, will touch anyone who knows how to enter into it, not through their opinions on something that exists independently of it, but through its own existence, through those inter-relations, constantly in movement, which enable us to transmit life itself. (Gleizes, 1928)

== Exhibitions ==
- Montross Gallery, New York, Pictures by Crotti, Duchamp, Gleizes, Metzinger, no. 40, April 4–22, 1916
- The Museum of Modern Art, New York, Cubism and Abstract Art, no. 88, March 2-April 19, 1936
- Toledo Museum of Art, Ohio, Contemporary Movements in European Painting, no. 40, November 6-December 11, 1938
- The Brooklyn Museum, New York, The Brooklyn Bridge, April 29-July 27, 1958
- The Solomon R. Guggenheim Museum, New York, Cézanne and Structure in Modern Painting, June 5-October 13, 1963
- The Solomon R. Guggenheim Museum, New York, Albert Gleizes, no. 84, September 15-November 1, 1964; Musée National d'Art Moderne, Paris, December 5, 1964-January 1965; Museum-Am-Ostwall, Dortmund, Germany, March 13-April 25, 1965
- Musée des Beaux-Arts, Bordeaux, La peinture française, collections américaines, cat. no. 96, May 13-September 15, 1966

== Related works ==
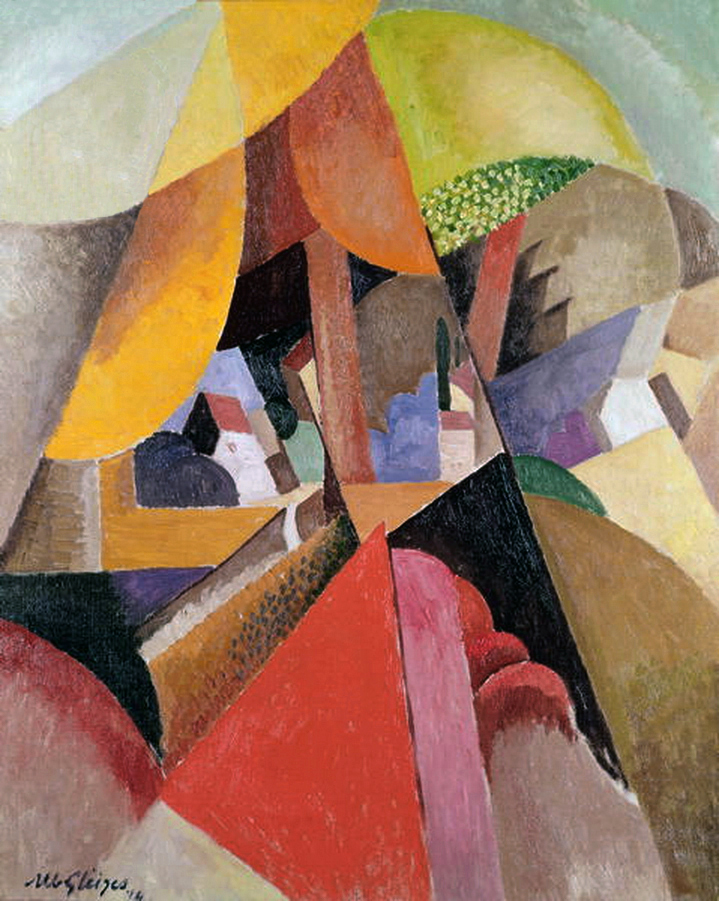
Albert Gleizes, 1914, Paysage avec un arbre (Landscape with Tree), oil on canvas, 100 x 81 cm, private collection

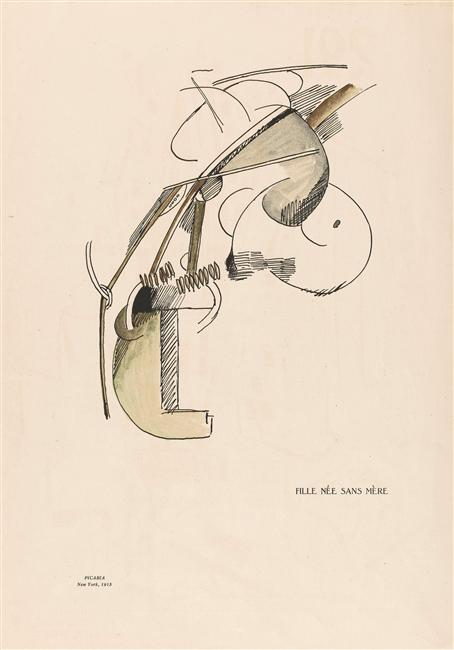
Francis Picabia, 1915, Fille née sans mère (Girl Born Without a Mother), work on paper, 47.4 x 31.7 cm, Musée d'Orsay

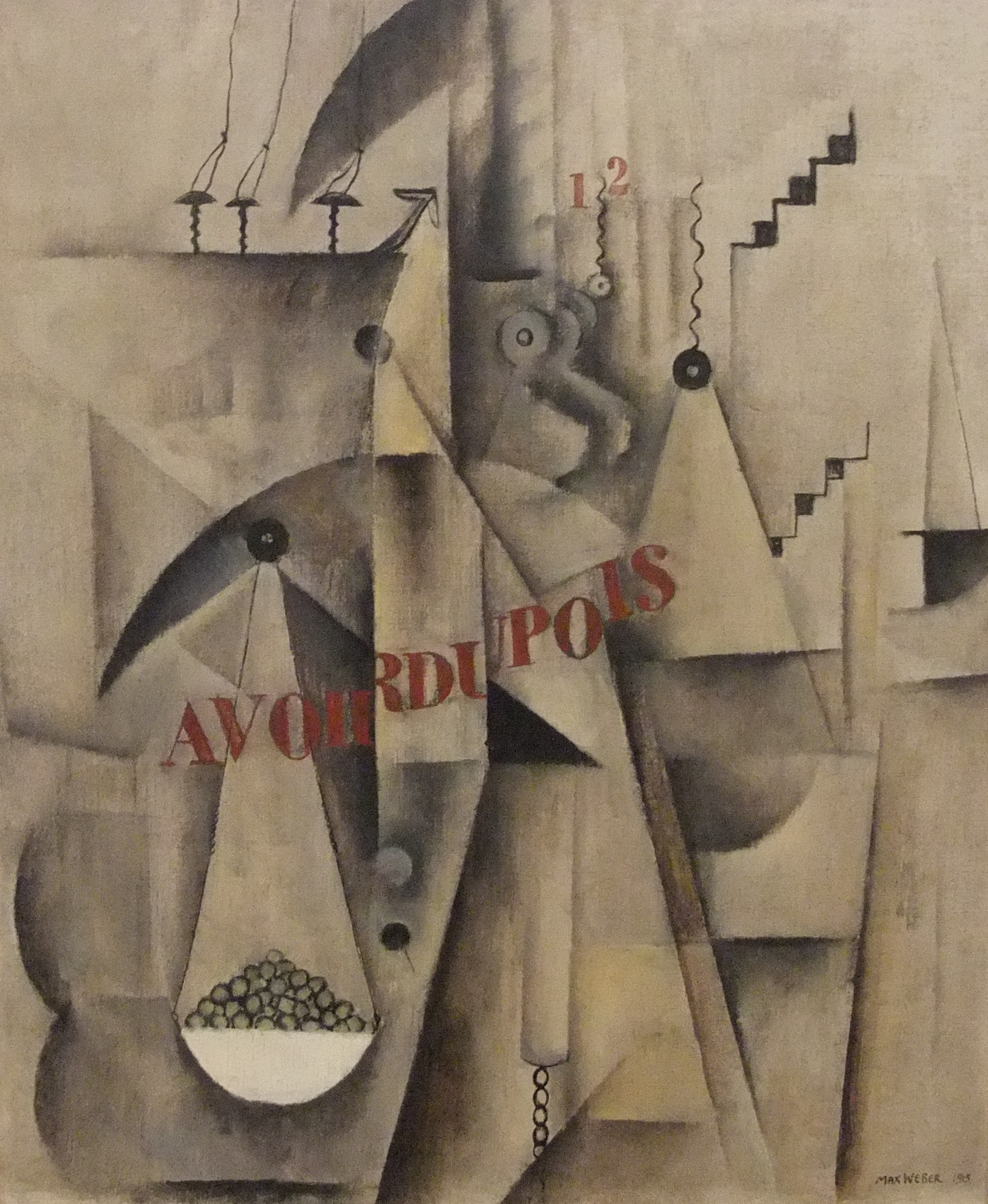
Max Weber, 1915, Avoirdupois, oil on canvas, 53.4 x 46.3 cm, Baltimore Museum of Art

Jean Crotti, 1916, L'harmonie nait du chaos, gouache on cardboard, 58.3 x 47 cm

== See also ==
- List of works by Albert Gleizes

== Bibliography ==
- 1915, The Literary Digest, 27 November 1915, p. 1225
- 1916, Montross Gallery (catalogue), New York, 1916, no. 40
- 1938, Hilla Rebay, Third enlarged catalogue of the Solomon R. Guggeneheim, p. 60
- 1950, Michel Seuphor, L'Art abstrait ses origines ses premiers maitres, ill. p. 146
- 1958, Brooklyn Bridge 75th anniversary exhibition: April 29-July
- 1960, Robert Rosenblum, Robert, Cubism and Twentieth Century Art, New York 1960, ill. p. 121
- 1963, Musée de Grenoble, Albert Gleizes et tempête dans les Salons, 1910-1914, p. 30
- 1964, Daniel Robbins, Albert Gleizes, 1881-1953: A Retrospective Exhibition, Solomon R. Guggenheim Museum, pp. 56, 84
- 1964, Saturday Review, Volume 47. p. 111
- 1964, James Fitzsimmons, Art International - Volume 8, Issues 5-10, p. 39
- 1970, Solomon R. Guggenheim Museum, Selections from the Guggenheim Museum Collection: 1900-1970, pp. 139, 140
- 1976, Angelica Zander Rudenstine, The Guggenheim Museum collection, Volume 1, Solomon R. Guggenheim Museum. pp. 53, 173
- 1980, Vivian Endicott Barnett, Solomon R. Guggenheim Museum, Handbook, the Guggenheim Museum collection, 1900-1980, p. 81
- 1982, Arts Magazine, Volume 57, Issues 1-4
- 1983, Judith Zilczer, Joseph Stella: The Hirshhorn Museum and Sculpture Garden, p. 35
- 1983, The Great East River Bridge, 1883-1983, p. 101
- 1984, Vivian Endicott Barnett, Thomas M. Messer, 100 works by modern masters from the Guggenheim Museum, p. 65
- 1987, Louise d'. Argencourt, Winnipeg Art Gallery, 1912, Breakup of Tradition, p. 92
- 1987, Art Center College of Design (Pasadena, Calif.), Atlantic sculpture, p. 40
- 1992, David Karel, Dictionnaire des artistes de langue française en Amérique, p. 352
- 1994, Precisionism in America, 1915-1941: Reordering Reality, p. 14
- 1996, Francis M. Naumann, Beth Venn, Todd Alden, Making mischief: Dada invades New York, p. 223
- 1999, Richard H. Love, Carl William Peters, Carl W. Peters: American Scene Painter from Rochester to Rockport, p. 270
- 2000, Charles Demuth, Bruce Kellner, Letters of Charles Demuth, American Artist, 1883-1935, p. 30
- 2000, François Noudelman, Avant-gardes et modernité - Edition 2000, p. 92
- 2001, Peter Brooke, Albert Gleizes: For and Against the Twentieth Century, p. 57
- 2001, Martin Klepper, Joseph C. Schöpp, Transatlantic Modernism, pp. 163, 169
- 2005, Bill Marshall, Cristina Johnston, France and the Americas: Culture, Politics, and History, p. 520
- 2006, David Tatham, North American Prints, 1913-1947: An Examination at Century's End. p. 125
- 2011, Laurette E. McCarthy, Walter Pach, Walter Pach (1883-1958): The Armory Show and the Untold Story of Modern Art in America
- 2012, Richard Haw, Art of the Brooklyn Bridge: A Visual History, p. 130
- 2012, Bennard B. Perlman, American Artists, Authors, and Collectors: The Walter Pach Letters 1906-1958, p. 274
- 2014, Guillaume Apollinaire, Dorothea Eimert, Cubism, p. 41
- 2014, Victoria Charles, Klaus Carl, Art Deco
