= Juliette Roche =

French painter

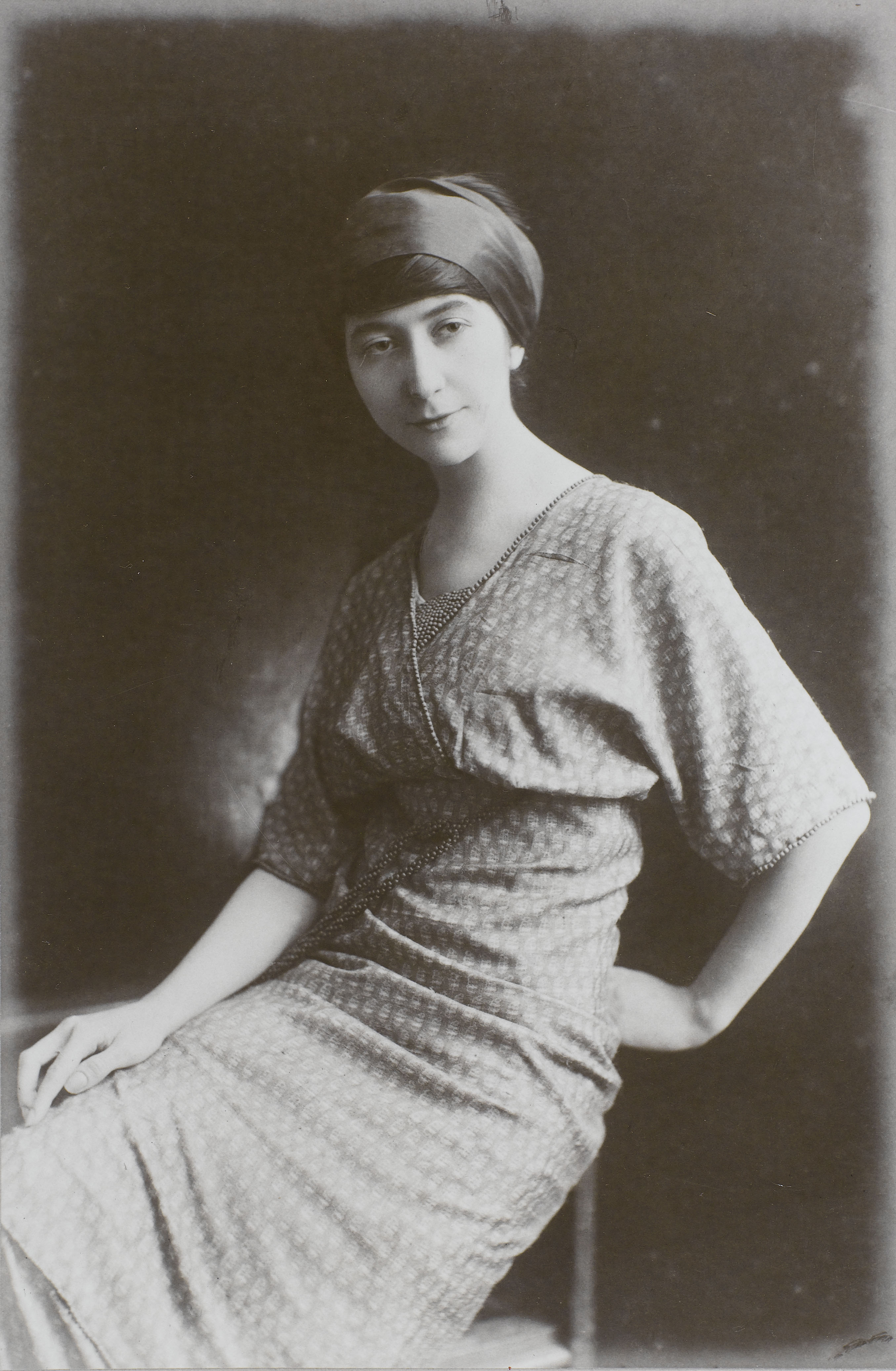
- Juliette Roche Gleizes, c.1913, Paris
- Born: 1884; Paris, France
- Died: 1980 (aged 96)
- Education: Académie Ranson
- Known for: painting, writing
- Movement: Cubism, Dada

Juliette Roche (1884–1980), also known as Juliette Roche Gleizes, was a French painter and writer who associated with members of the Cubist and Dada movements. She was married to the artist Albert Gleizes.

== Life ==
She was born in 1884 to a wealthy Parisian family. Her father, Jules Roche, was a prominent member of both the French government and avant-garde art world. Other strong connections to the art world were manifested in her relationships with her godmother, Élisabeth, Countess Greffulhe, and her father's godson, Jean Cocteau. Juliette Roche studied painting at the Académie Ranson in Paris, with the support of her father. There, she was introduced to the artistic style of Les Nabis. In her poetic and pictorial work she showed profiles of independent women capable of self-expression.

In 1913, she exhibited at the Salon des Indépendants and began writing poetry, inserting phrases, such as advertising slogans; experimenting with typographic elements. In 1914 she held her first solo exhibition at the Bernheim-Jeune gallery.

When the First World War broke out, she traveled to New York City with her soon to be husband, the Cubist artist Albert Gleizes, who she met through the intermediary of Ricciotto Canudo, a film theoretician who published an avant-garde magazine Montjoie!, promoting Cubism. Juliette Roche and Albert Gleizes were married in September 1915.

In New York, she took part in Dada activities with Marcel Duchamp and Francis Picabia, The Gleizeses then traveled to Barcelona to exhibit in the Galeries Dalmau before returning to New York. collaborating with Duchamp in the preparation of the first exhibition of the Society of Independent Artists of 1917, and Duchamp submitted his infamous readymade Fountain.

In 1919, she returned to Paris and began writing La minéralisation de Dudley Craving Mac Adam, published in 1924, a story that tells of the adventures of Ather Cravan and other artists in exile in New York.

In 1920–21, she wrote État... Colloidal, published by the Chilean journalist Vicente Huidobro in the magazine Creación.

In 1927, she and Albert Gleizes founded the Moly-Sabata, a residence of artists in Sablons, which offered studios and workshops. She continued to exhibit the rest of his life in group exhibitions.

== Gallery ==
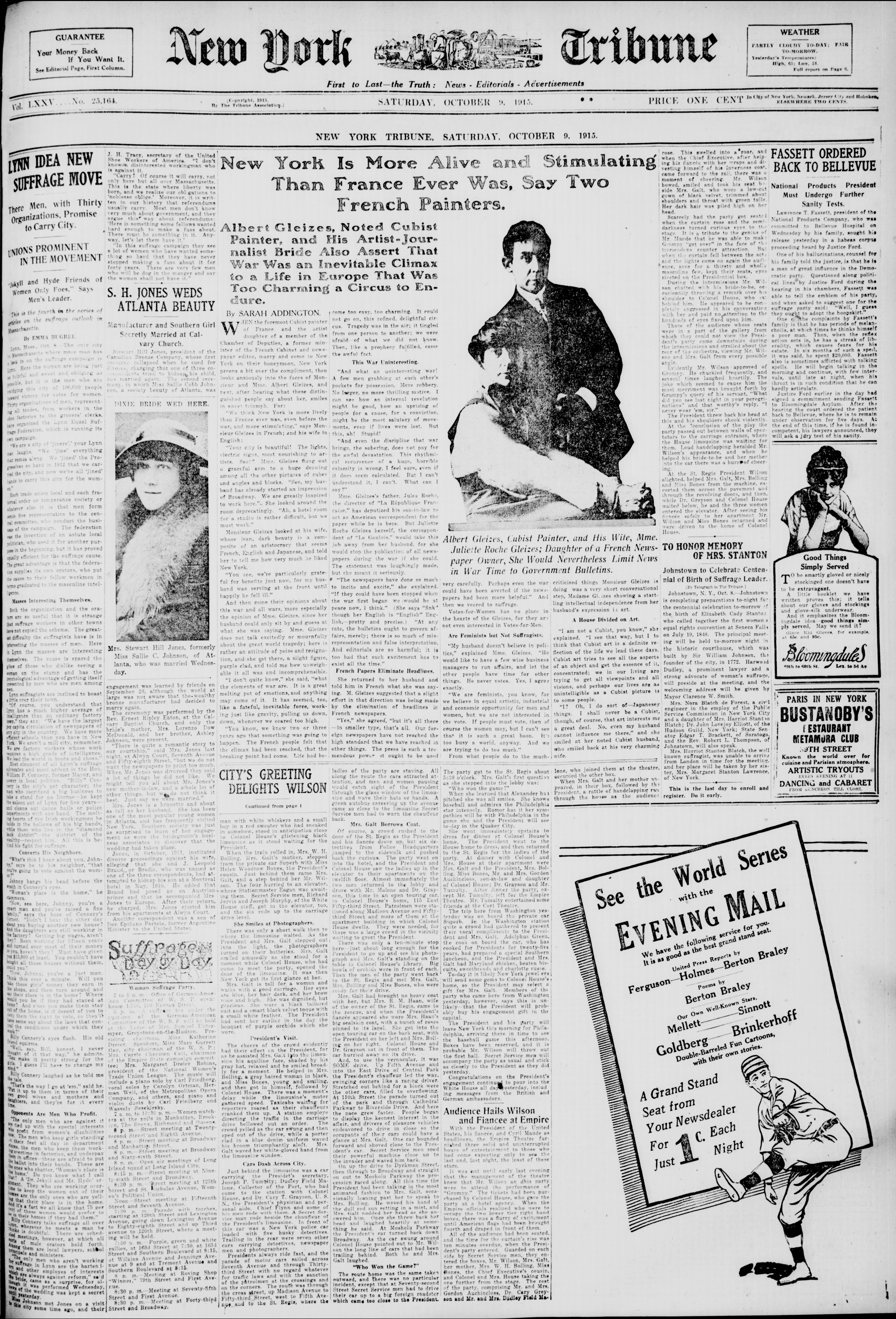
Albert Gleizes and his wife Juliette Roche, published in the New York Tribune, New York, 9 October 1915

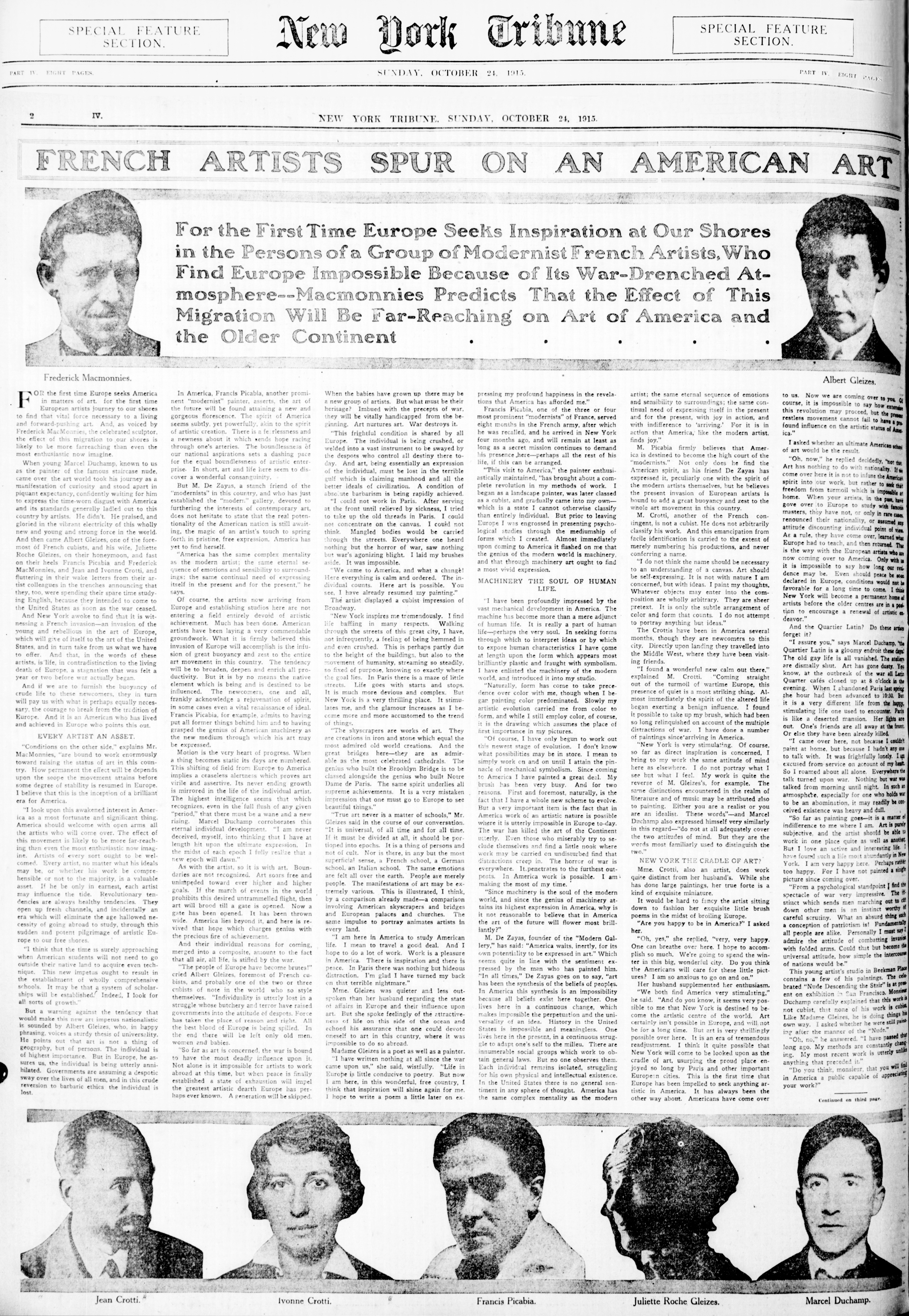
Frederick William MacMonnies, Albert Gleizes, Jean Crotti, Yvonne Chastel Crotti, Francis Picabia, Juliette Roche-Gleizes, Marcel Duchamp, New York Tribune, 24 October 1915
