= Tériade =

Greek writer, publisher and art critic (1897-1983)

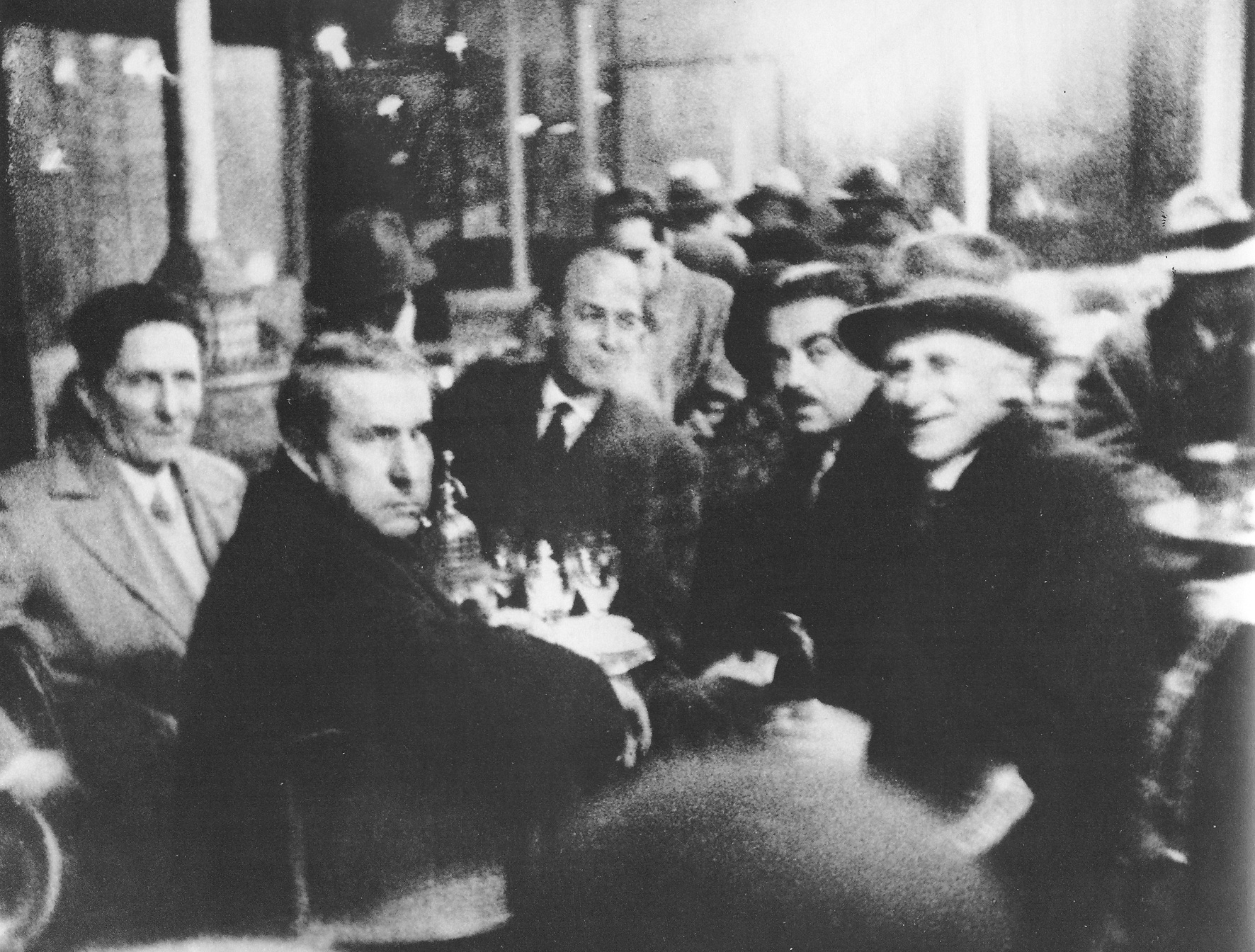
- Tériade with Pablo Manès, Gargallo and Christian Zervos at Café du Dôme, Paris, c. 1930
- Born: 2 May 1897; Mytilene, Greece
- Died: 23 October 1983 (aged 86); Paris, France

Tériade is the pen name of Stratis (or Efstratios) Eleftheriades (Greek: Στρατής Ελευθεριάδης; 2 May 1897 – 23 October 1983), a Greek writer and native of Mytilene who went to Paris in 1915 at the age of eighteen to study law. He instead became an art critic, patron, and, most significantly, a publisher.

In collaboration with Swiss publisher Albert Skira, E. Tériade founded the review Minotaure in 1933, a lavish magazine on "The plastic arts - poetry - music - architecture - ethnography and mythology - theater - psychoanalytical studies and observations." Although the magazine was not intended to be an entirely surrealist review, Skira formed an editorial committee that included André Breton, Marcel Duchamp, Paul Eluard, Maurice Heine, and Pierre Mabille, giving it a heavy surrealist prejudice from the start. For several years E. Tériade contributed and remained involved with the review, but ultimately departed in December 1937, when the 10th volume was published, in large part due to the ever-increasing surrealist direction of the review.

From 1937 to 1975 he commissioned various individuals of the pinnacle artists and philosophers such as Picasso, Matisse, René Daumal and his friend Marc Chagall in the first half of the century to produce series of works for his legendary quarterly journal Verve (1937-1960) or the later Grands Livres.

Tériade died in 1983 in Paris. There is a Tériade Museum, which opened in 1979 in the southern Mytilene suburb of Variá (Βαρειά). The books are displayed in sixteen rooms over two floors of the specially built museum.

In France, there is a donation of Tériade at the Departmental Museum of Le Cateau-Cambrésis.

== Bibliography ==
• Hommage à Tériade, Grand Palais, 16 mai - 3 septembre 1973, textes de Michel Anthonioz, Paris, Grand Palais, Centre National d'Art Contemporain, 1973, 68 p. : ill.; 21 cm. ISBN 0900946245

• Rebecca Rabinow, The legacy of la Rue Férou: Livres d' artiste created for Tériade by Rouault, Bonnard, Matisse, Léger, Le Corbusier, Chagall, Giacometti and Miró, thesis, New York University, 1995, 510 p.; 24 cm.

• Tériade & les livres de peintres, textes de Isabelle Monod-Fontaine, Claude Laugier, Dominique Szymusiak, Musée Matisse, Le Cateau-Cambrésis, 2002. 204 p. : ill.; 34 cm. ISBN 2907545337

• Niki Papadopoulou, Tériade et le livre de peintre manuscrit (1943-1975), Thèse, Sciences des textes et documents sous la dir. de Anne-Marie Christin, Paris 7, 2004. 413 p.; 30 cm.

• Chagall et Tériade: l'empreinte d'un peintre, Musée Départemental Matisse - Le Cateau-Cambrésis. Catalogue, textes de François Chapon, Céline Chicha, Montreuil, Gourcuff Gradenigo, 2006. 223 p. : ill. en noir et en coul., 30 cm. ISBN 2353400124

• Chara Kolokytha, 'L'amour de l'art en France est toujours aussi fécond : La Maison d'Editions Verve et la reproduction de manuscrits à peintures conservés dans les Bibliothèques de France pendant les années noires (1939-1944)', French Cultural Studies 2, vol.25, May 2014, pp. 121–139.
