= Verve (French magazine) =

French art and literature magazine

Verve was a modernist Parisian art magazine published by Teriade between 1937 and 1960. The magazine was first published in December 1937 with a cover featuring artwork by Henri Matisse. The headquarters of the magazine was in Paris. It published 38 issues in 10 volumes including lithographs by the most prominent artists of the Parisian art scene of the first half of the 20th century. In addition, the early contributors included James Joyce and Ernest Hemingway. The magazine folded in 1960.

== Bibliography ==
- Hans Bolliger, Tériade Éditeur-Revue Verve. Klipstein & Kornfeld, 1960
- Hommage à Tériade, Grand Palais, 16 mai - 3 septembre 1973, textes de Michel Anthonioz, Paris, Grand Palais, Centre National d’Art Contemporain, 1973, 68 p. : ill.; . ISBN 0900946245
- Chara Kolokytha, 'The Art Press and Visual Culture in Paris during the Great Depression: Cahiers d'Art, Minotaure and Verve' in: Visual Resources, An International Journal of Documentation 3, vol. 29 September 2013, pp. 184–215.
- Chara Kolokytha, ‘L’amour de l’art en France est toujours aussi fécond : La Maison d’Editions Verve et la reproduction de manuscrits à peintures conservés dans les Bibliothèques de France pendant les années noires (1939-1944)’, French Cultural Studies 2, vol.25, May 2014, pp. 121–139.
