= Jean Crotti =

French painter

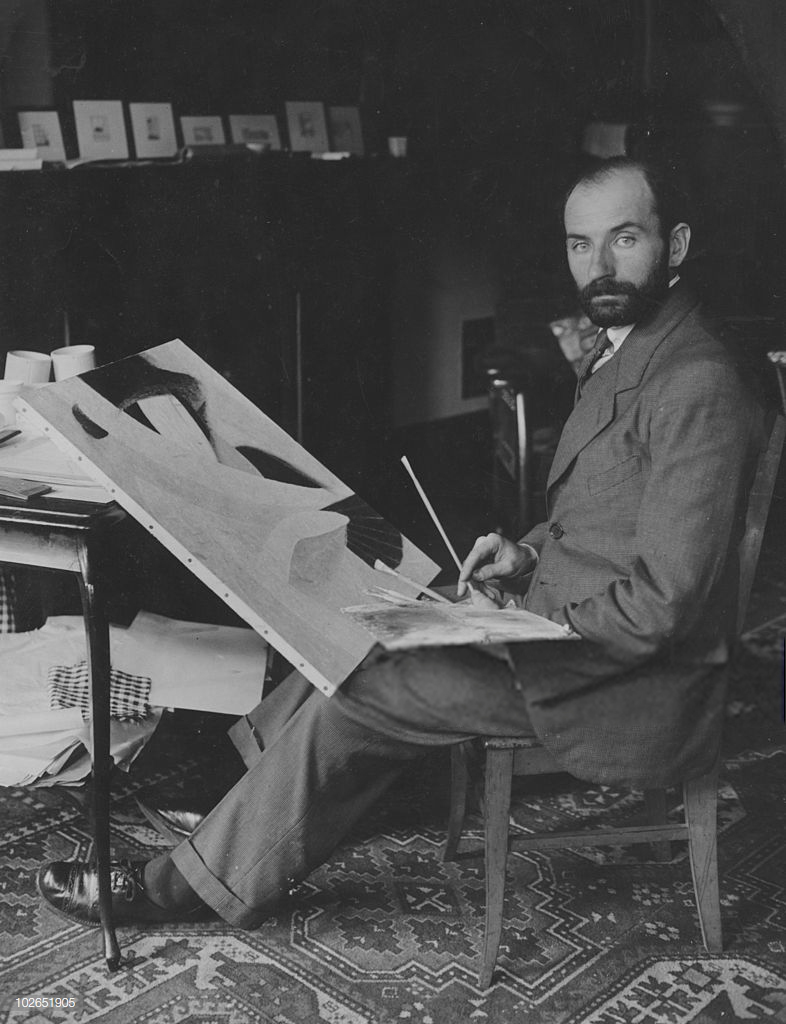
Jean Crotti, New York, c. 1915

Jean Crotti, 1915, Portrait of Marcel Duchamp (Sculpture made to measure), mixed media. Exhibited Montross Gallery 4–22 April 1916, New York City. Sculpture lost or destroyed. MoMA

Jean Crotti, 1915, Portrait of Marcel Duchamp (Sculpture made to measure), mixed media. Exhibited Montross Gallery 4–22 April 1916, New York City. Sculpture lost or destroyed

Jean Crotti, 1916, L'harmonie nait du chaos, gouache on cardboard, 58.3 x 47 cm

Jean Crotti (24 April 1878 – 30 January 1958) was a French painter.

Crotti was born in Bulle, Fribourg, Switzerland. He first studied at the Academy of Fine Arts, Munich, in Munich, Germany, then at age 23 moved to Paris to study art at the Académie Julian. Initially he was influenced by Impressionism, then by Fauvism and Art Nouveau. Around 1910 he began to experiment with Orphism, an offshoot of Cubism, and a style that would be enhanced by his association in New York City with Marcel Duchamp and Francis Picabia.

A refugee from World War I, he looked to America as a place where he could live and develop his art. In New York, he shared a studio with Marcel Duchamp and met his sister, Suzanne Duchamp. She was part of the Dada movement in which Crotti would become involved. In 1916, he exhibited Orphist-like paintings, several of which had religious titles that also included his Portrait of Marcel Duchamp and his much discussed Les Forces MÈcaniques de l'amour Mouvement, created by using found objects.

In the fall of 1916, Crotti separated from his wife, Yvonne Chastel, and returned to Paris. He had begun a relationship with Suzanne Duchamp that would culminate in his divorce in 1919 and immediate marriage to Suzanne. An artist in her own right, she would greatly influence Jean Crotti's painting. In 1920, he produced one of his best known works, a portrait of Thomas Edison. He participated in the 1925 Exposition International in Paris and the International Exhibition of Modern Art at the Brooklyn Museum in 1926–1927. Over the ensuing years, he would create numerous paintings and be the subject for several solo exhibitions at major galleries in England, France, Germany, and the United States.

Crotti died in Paris.

Jean Crotti's heirs donated his personal papers to the Archives of American Art, Smithsonian Institution, where they can be consulted by researchers.

In 2011, Francis M. Naumann Fine Art showed an exhibition, Inhabiting Abstraction, including important examples from every significant phase and development in the realm of abstraction that Crotti explored, as well as one-of-a-kind works such as "Parterre de reve" (1920), in which he framed his painting palette and then signed it.
